This is a partial list of unnumbered minor planets for principal provisional designations assigned during 16–31 August 2002. Since this period yielded a high number of provisional discoveries, it is further split into several standalone pages. , a total of 441 bodies remain unnumbered for this period. Objects for this year are listed on the following pages: A–B · C · D–F · G–K · L–O · P · Qi · Qii · Ri · Rii · S · Ti · Tii · U–V and W–Y. Also see previous and next year.

Q 

|- id="2002 QA120" bgcolor=#E9E9E9
| 0 ||  || MBA-M || 17.5 || 1.3 km || multiple || 2002–2018 || 18 Mar 2018 || 42 || align=left | Disc.: NEAT || 
|- id="2002 QC120" bgcolor=#E9E9E9
| 0 ||  || MBA-M || 17.10 || 2.1 km || multiple || 2000–2022 || 07 Jan 2022 || 164 || align=left | Disc.: NEATAlt.: 2014 DJ61, 2019 JQ10 || 
|- id="2002 QJ120" bgcolor=#E9E9E9
| – ||  || MBA-M || 19.3 || data-sort-value="0.41" | 410 m || single || 17 days || 15 Sep 2002 || 9 || align=left | Disc.: NEAT || 
|- id="2002 QL120" bgcolor=#d6d6d6
| 0 ||  || MBA-O || 16.6 || 2.7 km || multiple || 2002–2019 || 20 Dec 2019 || 93 || align=left | Disc.: NEATAlt.: 2008 VD11, 2015 AQ65 || 
|- id="2002 QP120" bgcolor=#E9E9E9
| 1 ||  || MBA-M || 17.7 || 1.2 km || multiple || 2002–2020 || 17 Nov 2020 || 43 || align=left | Disc.: NEAT || 
|- id="2002 QR120" bgcolor=#fefefe
| 0 ||  || MBA-I || 18.3 || data-sort-value="0.65" | 650 m || multiple || 2002–2021 || 18 Jan 2021 || 53 || align=left | Disc.: NEAT || 
|- id="2002 QS120" bgcolor=#E9E9E9
| 0 ||  || MBA-M || 17.89 || data-sort-value="0.79" | 790 m || multiple || 2002–2021 || 07 Apr 2021 || 52 || align=left | Disc.: NEAT || 
|- id="2002 QT120" bgcolor=#d6d6d6
| 0 ||  || MBA-O || 16.92 || 2.3 km || multiple || 2002–2021 || 04 May 2021 || 83 || align=left | Disc.: NEAT || 
|- id="2002 QW120" bgcolor=#fefefe
| 0 ||  || MBA-I || 18.0 || data-sort-value="0.75" | 750 m || multiple || 2001–2020 || 17 Sep 2020 || 107 || align=left | Disc.: NEATAlt.: 2016 JZ31 || 
|- id="2002 QY120" bgcolor=#E9E9E9
| 0 ||  || MBA-M || 17.9 || 1.5 km || multiple || 2002–2020 || 21 Jul 2020 || 38 || align=left | Disc.: NEAT || 
|- id="2002 QB121" bgcolor=#E9E9E9
| – ||  || MBA-M || 18.1 || 1.3 km || single || 16 days || 12 Sep 2002 || 11 || align=left | Disc.: NEAT || 
|- id="2002 QC121" bgcolor=#E9E9E9
| 0 ||  || MBA-M || 17.3 || 1.5 km || multiple || 1998–2021 || 08 Jan 2021 || 98 || align=left | Disc.: NEAT || 
|- id="2002 QG121" bgcolor=#d6d6d6
| 0 ||  || MBA-O || 16.9 || 2.3 km || multiple || 2002–2018 || 05 Oct 2018 || 56 || align=left | Disc.: NEATAlt.: 2013 TG38 || 
|- id="2002 QO121" bgcolor=#d6d6d6
| 0 ||  || MBA-O || 16.7 || 2.5 km || multiple || 2002–2019 || 18 Nov 2019 || 49 || align=left | Disc.: NEAT || 
|- id="2002 QQ121" bgcolor=#E9E9E9
| 0 ||  || MBA-M || 18.14 || 1.3 km || multiple || 2002–2021 || 07 Nov 2021 || 43 || align=left | Disc.: NEAT || 
|- id="2002 QS121" bgcolor=#fefefe
| 0 ||  || MBA-I || 18.66 || data-sort-value="0.55" | 550 m || multiple || 2002–2021 || 07 Apr 2021 || 73 || align=left | Disc.: NEAT || 
|- id="2002 QW121" bgcolor=#fefefe
| 2 ||  || MBA-I || 19.1 || data-sort-value="0.45" | 450 m || multiple || 2002–2015 || 22 Jun 2015 || 47 || align=left | Disc.: NEATAlt.: 2012 TA32 || 
|- id="2002 QX121" bgcolor=#fefefe
| 3 ||  || MBA-I || 19.2 || data-sort-value="0.43" | 430 m || multiple || 2002–2016 || 20 Oct 2016 || 26 || align=left | Disc.: NEAT || 
|- id="2002 QC122" bgcolor=#d6d6d6
| 0 ||  || MBA-O || 17.2 || 2.0 km || multiple || 2002–2021 || 18 Jan 2021 || 67 || align=left | Disc.: NEAT || 
|- id="2002 QJ122" bgcolor=#E9E9E9
| 1 ||  || MBA-M || 17.79 || 1.5 km || multiple || 2002–2021 || 27 Oct 2021 || 24 || align=left | Disc.: NEAT || 
|- id="2002 QP122" bgcolor=#d6d6d6
| 0 ||  || MBA-O || 16.8 || 2.4 km || multiple || 2002–2019 || 27 Oct 2019 || 68 || align=left | Disc.: NEAT || 
|- id="2002 QU122" bgcolor=#E9E9E9
| 0 ||  || MBA-M || 17.2 || 2.0 km || multiple || 2002–2021 || 05 Jan 2021 || 91 || align=left | Disc.: NEATAlt.: 2007 XT7 || 
|- id="2002 QZ122" bgcolor=#E9E9E9
| 2 ||  || MBA-M || 18.1 || data-sort-value="0.71" | 710 m || multiple || 2002–2019 || 08 Nov 2019 || 63 || align=left | Disc.: NEATAlt.: 2015 XL212 || 
|- id="2002 QE123" bgcolor=#E9E9E9
| 0 ||  || MBA-M || 17.8 || data-sort-value="0.82" | 820 m || multiple || 2002–2019 || 19 Dec 2019 || 41 || align=left | Disc.: NEAT || 
|- id="2002 QH123" bgcolor=#fefefe
| 0 ||  || MBA-I || 17.9 || data-sort-value="0.78" | 780 m || multiple || 2002–2020 || 17 Dec 2020 || 64 || align=left | Disc.: NEAT || 
|- id="2002 QQ123" bgcolor=#E9E9E9
| 0 ||  || MBA-M || 17.9 || 1.1 km || multiple || 2002–2020 || 12 Dec 2020 || 155 || align=left | Disc.: NEAT || 
|- id="2002 QS123" bgcolor=#E9E9E9
| 0 ||  || MBA-M || 18.3 || data-sort-value="0.65" | 650 m || multiple || 1998–2019 || 08 Nov 2019 || 45 || align=left | Disc.: SpacewatchAlt.: 1998 SJ17 || 
|- id="2002 QT123" bgcolor=#E9E9E9
| 1 ||  || MBA-M || 17.9 || 1.1 km || multiple || 2002–2019 || 27 Oct 2019 || 56 || align=left | Disc.: NEATAlt.: 2015 WC6 || 
|- id="2002 QB124" bgcolor=#fefefe
| 1 ||  || MBA-I || 18.6 || data-sort-value="0.57" | 570 m || multiple || 1995–2020 || 06 Dec 2020 || 109 || align=left | Disc.: NEAT || 
|- id="2002 QC124" bgcolor=#d6d6d6
| 0 ||  || MBA-O || 16.8 || 2.4 km || multiple || 2002–2021 || 18 Jan 2021 || 132 || align=left | Disc.: NEATAlt.: 2008 US213 || 
|- id="2002 QE124" bgcolor=#E9E9E9
| 0 ||  || MBA-M || 17.71 || data-sort-value="0.85" | 850 m || multiple || 2002–2021 || 13 May 2021 || 88 || align=left | Disc.: NEATAlt.: 2014 QM340 || 
|- id="2002 QG124" bgcolor=#fefefe
| 0 ||  || MBA-I || 18.7 || data-sort-value="0.54" | 540 m || multiple || 2002–2018 || 13 Aug 2018 || 119 || align=left | Disc.: NEAT || 
|- id="2002 QM124" bgcolor=#d6d6d6
| 0 ||  || MBA-O || 16.3 || 3.1 km || multiple || 2002–2021 || 18 Jan 2021 || 143 || align=left | Disc.: NEAT || 
|- id="2002 QQ124" bgcolor=#E9E9E9
| 0 ||  || MBA-M || 17.5 || 1.3 km || multiple || 2002–2017 || 31 Jan 2017 || 72 || align=left | Disc.: NEAT || 
|- id="2002 QS124" bgcolor=#E9E9E9
| 0 ||  || MBA-M || 17.2 || 1.5 km || multiple || 2002–2020 || 08 Dec 2020 || 169 || align=left | Disc.: NEATAlt.: 2011 QU1 || 
|- id="2002 QU124" bgcolor=#E9E9E9
| 0 ||  || MBA-M || 17.3 || 1.5 km || multiple || 2002–2021 || 03 Jan 2021 || 109 || align=left | Disc.: NEATAlt.: 2015 OJ7 || 
|- id="2002 QV124" bgcolor=#d6d6d6
| 0 ||  || MBA-O || 16.3 || 3.1 km || multiple || 2001–2020 || 06 Dec 2020 || 135 || align=left | Disc.: NEATAlt.: 2006 CU7 || 
|- id="2002 QB125" bgcolor=#fefefe
| 1 ||  || MBA-I || 18.1 || data-sort-value="0.71" | 710 m || multiple || 2002–2021 || 04 Jan 2021 || 59 || align=left | Disc.: NEATAlt.: 2013 YW141 || 
|- id="2002 QD125" bgcolor=#fefefe
| 0 ||  || MBA-I || 18.48 || data-sort-value="0.60" | 600 m || multiple || 2002–2021 || 01 Nov 2021 || 61 || align=left | Disc.: NEAT || 
|- id="2002 QK125" bgcolor=#E9E9E9
| 3 ||  || MBA-M || 18.1 || data-sort-value="0.71" | 710 m || multiple || 2002–2019 || 19 Nov 2019 || 35 || align=left | Disc.: NEAT || 
|- id="2002 QL125" bgcolor=#fefefe
| 0 ||  || MBA-I || 19.64 || data-sort-value="0.35" | 350 m || multiple || 2002–2021 || 01 Jul 2021 || 33 || align=left | Disc.: NEAT || 
|- id="2002 QU125" bgcolor=#E9E9E9
| 0 ||  || MBA-M || 17.6 || data-sort-value="0.90" | 900 m || multiple || 2002–2019 || 28 Dec 2019 || 84 || align=left | Disc.: NEAT || 
|- id="2002 QV125" bgcolor=#E9E9E9
| 2 ||  || MBA-M || 18.6 || data-sort-value="0.80" | 800 m || multiple || 2002–2019 || 25 Sep 2019 || 46 || align=left | Disc.: NEAT || 
|- id="2002 QW125" bgcolor=#E9E9E9
| 0 ||  || MBA-M || 17.5 || 1.8 km || multiple || 2002–2020 || 16 Nov 2020 || 73 || align=left | Disc.: NEAT || 
|- id="2002 QY125" bgcolor=#d6d6d6
| 0 ||  || MBA-O || 16.8 || 2.4 km || multiple || 2002–2020 || 08 Dec 2020 || 54 || align=left | Disc.: NEAT || 
|- id="2002 QZ125" bgcolor=#E9E9E9
| 0 ||  || MBA-M || 17.4 || 1.4 km || multiple || 2002–2020 || 06 Dec 2020 || 77 || align=left | Disc.: NEAT || 
|- id="2002 QF126" bgcolor=#d6d6d6
| 0 ||  || MBA-O || 16.6 || 2.7 km || multiple || 2002–2019 || 03 Nov 2019 || 99 || align=left | Disc.: NEATAlt.: 2013 RQ67 || 
|- id="2002 QH126" bgcolor=#fefefe
| 0 ||  || MBA-I || 17.66 || data-sort-value="0.87" | 870 m || multiple || 2002–2021 || 08 Dec 2021 || 138 || align=left | Disc.: NEAT || 
|- id="2002 QJ126" bgcolor=#d6d6d6
| 0 ||  || MBA-O || 16.4 || 2.9 km || multiple || 2002–2019 || 05 Nov 2019 || 109 || align=left | Disc.: NEAT || 
|- id="2002 QM126" bgcolor=#E9E9E9
| 0 ||  || MBA-M || 17.4 || 1.8 km || multiple || 2002–2020 || 16 Nov 2020 || 139 || align=left | Disc.: NEAT || 
|- id="2002 QN126" bgcolor=#fefefe
| 1 ||  || MBA-I || 18.6 || data-sort-value="0.57" | 570 m || multiple || 2002–2020 || 20 Oct 2020 || 76 || align=left | Disc.: NEAT || 
|- id="2002 QP126" bgcolor=#fefefe
| 0 ||  || MBA-I || 18.61 || data-sort-value="0.56" | 560 m || multiple || 2002–2021 || 15 Apr 2021 || 64 || align=left | Disc.: NEAT || 
|- id="2002 QS126" bgcolor=#d6d6d6
| 0 ||  || MBA-O || 17.14 || 2.1 km || multiple || 2002–2021 || 31 May 2021 || 52 || align=left | Disc.: NEAT || 
|- id="2002 QV126" bgcolor=#E9E9E9
| 0 ||  || MBA-M || 17.69 || data-sort-value="0.86" | 860 m || multiple || 2002–2021 || 31 May 2021 || 125 || align=left | Disc.: NEAT || 
|- id="2002 QW126" bgcolor=#E9E9E9
| 1 ||  || MBA-M || 18.0 || data-sort-value="0.75" | 750 m || multiple || 2002–2018 || 08 Aug 2018 || 80 || align=left | Disc.: NEATAlt.: 2014 PY63 || 
|- id="2002 QD127" bgcolor=#E9E9E9
| 3 ||  || MBA-M || 18.7 || data-sort-value="0.54" | 540 m || multiple || 1998–2014 || 26 Jul 2014 || 30 || align=left | Disc.: SpacewatchAlt.: 1998 RO13 || 
|- id="2002 QH127" bgcolor=#fefefe
| 0 ||  || MBA-I || 18.34 || data-sort-value="0.64" | 640 m || multiple || 2002–2021 || 02 Oct 2021 || 78 || align=left | Disc.: NEATAlt.: 2006 SU299 || 
|- id="2002 QL127" bgcolor=#E9E9E9
| 0 ||  || MBA-M || 16.45 || 1.5 km || multiple || 2002–2021 || 08 Apr 2021 || 237 || align=left | Disc.: NEAT || 
|- id="2002 QQ127" bgcolor=#d6d6d6
| 0 ||  || MBA-O || 17.18 || 2.0 km || multiple || 2002–2022 || 27 Jan 2022 || 32 || align=left | Disc.: NEAT || 
|- id="2002 QR127" bgcolor=#d6d6d6
| 0 ||  || MBA-O || 16.8 || 2.4 km || multiple || 2002–2020 || 17 Nov 2020 || 66 || align=left | Disc.: NEATAlt.: 2008 RC9 || 
|- id="2002 QU127" bgcolor=#fefefe
| 0 ||  || MBA-I || 18.6 || data-sort-value="0.57" | 570 m || multiple || 2002–2018 || 14 Aug 2018 || 64 || align=left | Disc.: NEAT || 
|- id="2002 QZ127" bgcolor=#E9E9E9
| – ||  || MBA-M || 18.7 || data-sort-value="0.54" | 540 m || single || 35 days || 15 Sep 2002 || 21 || align=left | Disc.: NEAT || 
|- id="2002 QH128" bgcolor=#E9E9E9
| 0 ||  || MBA-M || 17.8 || 2.0 km || multiple || 2002–2019 || 18 Sep 2019 || 65 || align=left | Disc.: NEATAlt.: 2010 JG77, 2010 PX45 || 
|- id="2002 QK128" bgcolor=#E9E9E9
| 0 ||  || MBA-M || 17.9 || 1.1 km || multiple || 2002–2019 || 29 Sep 2019 || 60 || align=left | Disc.: NEAT || 
|- id="2002 QN128" bgcolor=#FA8072
| 3 ||  || MCA || 18.8 || data-sort-value="0.52" | 520 m || multiple || 2002–2017 || 17 Sep 2017 || 17 || align=left | Disc.: NEAT || 
|- id="2002 QT128" bgcolor=#d6d6d6
| 0 ||  || MBA-O || 16.42 || 2.9 km || multiple || 1996–2021 || 12 May 2021 || 210 || align=left | Disc.: NEATAlt.: 2010 CL251 || 
|- id="2002 QB129" bgcolor=#fefefe
| – ||  || MBA-I || 19.4 || data-sort-value="0.39" | 390 m || single || 12 days || 30 Aug 2002 || 11 || align=left | Disc.: NEAT || 
|- id="2002 QG129" bgcolor=#d6d6d6
| 0 ||  || MBA-O || 17.0 || 2.2 km || multiple || 2002–2019 || 24 Nov 2019 || 59 || align=left | Disc.: NEATAlt.: 2008 WO64 || 
|- id="2002 QJ129" bgcolor=#d6d6d6
| 0 ||  || MBA-O || 16.31 || 3.0 km || multiple || 2002–2021 || 15 Apr 2021 || 143 || align=left | Disc.: NEATAlt.: 2013 SD73 || 
|- id="2002 QT129" bgcolor=#d6d6d6
| – ||  || MBA-O || 17.9 || 1.5 km || single || 38 days || 15 Sep 2002 || 15 || align=left | Disc.: NEAT || 
|- id="2002 QU129" bgcolor=#E9E9E9
| 0 ||  || MBA-M || 17.5 || 1.3 km || multiple || 2002–2021 || 11 Jan 2021 || 97 || align=left | Disc.: NEAT || 
|- id="2002 QD130" bgcolor=#d6d6d6
| 2 ||  || MBA-O || 16.3 || 3.1 km || multiple || 2002–2018 || 18 Oct 2018 || 49 || align=left | Disc.: NEAT || 
|- id="2002 QK130" bgcolor=#E9E9E9
| 0 ||  || MBA-M || 17.3 || 1.5 km || multiple || 2002–2021 || 14 Jan 2021 || 109 || align=left | Disc.: NEAT || 
|- id="2002 QN130" bgcolor=#fefefe
| 0 ||  || MBA-I || 17.9 || data-sort-value="0.78" | 780 m || multiple || 2002–2020 || 15 Sep 2020 || 95 || align=left | Disc.: NEATAlt.: 2012 FL32 || 
|- id="2002 QP130" bgcolor=#fefefe
| 0 ||  || MBA-I || 18.2 || data-sort-value="0.68" | 680 m || multiple || 1995–2020 || 08 Nov 2020 || 67 || align=left | Disc.: NEAT || 
|- id="2002 QS130" bgcolor=#E9E9E9
| 1 ||  || MBA-M || 17.3 || 1.5 km || multiple || 2002–2020 || 12 Dec 2020 || 102 || align=left | Disc.: NEAT || 
|- id="2002 QU130" bgcolor=#E9E9E9
| 1 ||  || MBA-M || 17.8 || data-sort-value="0.82" | 820 m || multiple || 2002–2019 || 30 Nov 2019 || 79 || align=left | Disc.: NEAT || 
|- id="2002 QA131" bgcolor=#E9E9E9
| 1 ||  || MBA-M || 17.6 || 1.3 km || multiple || 2002–2019 || 24 Oct 2019 || 52 || align=left | Disc.: NEAT || 
|- id="2002 QD131" bgcolor=#E9E9E9
| 1 ||  || MBA-M || 17.9 || 1.1 km || multiple || 2002–2019 || 25 Jul 2019 || 25 || align=left | Disc.: NEAT || 
|- id="2002 QE131" bgcolor=#fefefe
| 0 ||  || MBA-I || 18.6 || data-sort-value="0.57" | 570 m || multiple || 2002–2020 || 29 Jun 2020 || 65 || align=left | Disc.: NEATAlt.: 2016 HP18 || 
|- id="2002 QH131" bgcolor=#E9E9E9
| 0 ||  || MBA-M || 17.8 || 1.2 km || multiple || 2002–2020 || 23 Dec 2020 || 57 || align=left | Disc.: NEATAlt.: 2011 WB54 || 
|- id="2002 QV131" bgcolor=#E9E9E9
| 1 ||  || MBA-M || 18.0 || data-sort-value="0.75" | 750 m || multiple || 2002–2020 || 22 Jan 2020 || 61 || align=left | Disc.: NEATAlt.: 2015 XY367 || 
|- id="2002 QW131" bgcolor=#d6d6d6
| 0 ||  || MBA-O || 16.5 || 2.8 km || multiple || 2002–2019 || 05 Nov 2019 || 58 || align=left | Disc.: NEAT || 
|- id="2002 QY131" bgcolor=#E9E9E9
| 0 ||  || MBA-M || 17.6 || 1.7 km || multiple || 2002–2020 || 17 Sep 2020 || 60 || align=left | Disc.: NEAT || 
|- id="2002 QA132" bgcolor=#fefefe
| 0 ||  || MBA-I || 19.1 || data-sort-value="0.45" | 450 m || multiple || 2002–2019 || 28 May 2019 || 42 || align=left | Disc.: NEAT || 
|- id="2002 QF132" bgcolor=#FA8072
| 0 ||  || MCA || 19.2 || data-sort-value="0.43" | 430 m || multiple || 1999–2018 || 07 Aug 2018 || 82 || align=left | Disc.: NEAT || 
|- id="2002 QG132" bgcolor=#fefefe
| 0 ||  || MBA-I || 18.07 || data-sort-value="0.72" | 720 m || multiple || 2002–2021 || 11 May 2021 || 100 || align=left | Disc.: NEAT || 
|- id="2002 QH132" bgcolor=#fefefe
| 1 ||  || MBA-I || 18.9 || data-sort-value="0.49" | 490 m || multiple || 2002–2019 || 24 Sep 2019 || 33 || align=left | Disc.: NEAT || 
|- id="2002 QK132" bgcolor=#d6d6d6
| 0 ||  || MBA-O || 17.73 || 1.6 km || multiple || 2002–2021 || 28 Aug 2021 || 29 || align=left | Disc.: NEAT Added on 21 August 2021 || 
|- id="2002 QU132" bgcolor=#E9E9E9
| 1 ||  || MBA-M || 18.4 || data-sort-value="0.88" | 880 m || multiple || 1998–2019 || 24 Oct 2019 || 70 || align=left | Disc.: NEAT || 
|- id="2002 QW132" bgcolor=#fefefe
| 0 ||  || MBA-I || 18.8 || data-sort-value="0.52" | 520 m || multiple || 2002–2020 || 01 Feb 2020 || 84 || align=left | Disc.: NEATAlt.: 2012 VF47 || 
|- id="2002 QY132" bgcolor=#E9E9E9
| 0 ||  || MBA-M || 18.1 || data-sort-value="0.71" | 710 m || multiple || 2002–2019 || 04 Dec 2019 || 45 || align=left | Disc.: NEAT || 
|- id="2002 QC133" bgcolor=#E9E9E9
| 0 ||  || MBA-M || 17.5 || 1.3 km || multiple || 2002–2020 || 14 Dec 2020 || 92 || align=left | Disc.: NEATAlt.: 2011 SC128 || 
|- id="2002 QD133" bgcolor=#E9E9E9
| 0 ||  || MBA-M || 17.4 || 1.4 km || multiple || 1998–2020 || 24 Dec 2020 || 130 || align=left | Disc.: NEAT || 
|- id="2002 QK133" bgcolor=#fefefe
| 0 ||  || MBA-I || 18.5 || data-sort-value="0.59" | 590 m || multiple || 2002–2021 || 06 Jan 2021 || 53 || align=left | Disc.: NEATAlt.: 2016 RJ29 || 
|- id="2002 QN133" bgcolor=#d6d6d6
| 0 ||  || MBA-O || 17.33 || 1.9 km || multiple || 2002-2022 || 31 Jan 2022 || 32 || align=left | Disc.: NEAT || 
|- id="2002 QO133" bgcolor=#E9E9E9
| 1 ||  || MBA-M || 18.0 || 1.1 km || multiple || 2002–2021 || 05 Jan 2021 || 65 || align=left | Disc.: NEAT || 
|- id="2002 QP133" bgcolor=#E9E9E9
| 2 ||  || MBA-M || 18.2 || data-sort-value="0.96" | 960 m || multiple || 2002–2015 || 02 Nov 2015 || 30 || align=left | Disc.: NEAT || 
|- id="2002 QQ133" bgcolor=#E9E9E9
| 3 ||  || MBA-M || 18.8 || data-sort-value="0.52" | 520 m || multiple || 2002–2018 || 05 Aug 2018 || 39 || align=left | Disc.: NEATAlt.: 2014 NY49 || 
|- id="2002 QR133" bgcolor=#E9E9E9
| 0 ||  || MBA-M || 17.8 || 1.5 km || multiple || 2002–2020 || 22 Aug 2020 || 62 || align=left | Disc.: NEAT || 
|- id="2002 QU133" bgcolor=#E9E9E9
| 0 ||  || MBA-M || 18.0 || 1.1 km || multiple || 1998–2019 || 03 Sep 2019 || 50 || align=left | Disc.: NEAT || 
|- id="2002 QX133" bgcolor=#d6d6d6
| 0 ||  || MBA-O || 17.1 || 2.1 km || multiple || 2002–2020 || 26 Jan 2020 || 54 || align=left | Disc.: NEATAlt.: 2015 BJ385 || 
|- id="2002 QY133" bgcolor=#d6d6d6
| 0 ||  || MBA-O || 16.3 || 3.1 km || multiple || 2002–2021 || 15 Jan 2021 || 102 || align=left | Disc.: NEAT || 
|- id="2002 QZ133" bgcolor=#E9E9E9
| 1 ||  || MBA-M || 18.0 || data-sort-value="0.75" | 750 m || multiple || 2002–2019 || 19 Dec 2019 || 43 || align=left | Disc.: NEAT || 
|- id="2002 QD134" bgcolor=#fefefe
| 2 ||  || MBA-I || 18.6 || data-sort-value="0.57" | 570 m || multiple || 2002–2021 || 18 Jan 2021 || 87 || align=left | Disc.: NEATAlt.: 2016 TF15 || 
|- id="2002 QE134" bgcolor=#E9E9E9
| 1 ||  || MBA-M || 18.0 || 1.1 km || multiple || 2002–2019 || 24 Oct 2019 || 43 || align=left | Disc.: NEAT || 
|- id="2002 QF134" bgcolor=#E9E9E9
| 0 ||  || MBA-M || 17.44 || data-sort-value="0.97" | 970 m || multiple || 2002–2021 || 30 May 2021 || 76 || align=left | Disc.: NEAT || 
|- id="2002 QO134" bgcolor=#d6d6d6
| 0 ||  || MBA-O || 16.6 || 2.7 km || multiple || 2002–2021 || 18 Jan 2021 || 113 || align=left | Disc.: NEAT || 
|- id="2002 QU134" bgcolor=#fefefe
| 3 ||  || MBA-I || 18.7 || data-sort-value="0.54" | 540 m || multiple || 2002–2017 || 19 Nov 2017 || 24 || align=left | Disc.: NEAT || 
|- id="2002 QV134" bgcolor=#d6d6d6
| 0 ||  || MBA-O || 17.0 || 2.2 km || multiple || 2002–2020 || 20 Apr 2020 || 58 || align=left | Disc.: NEAT || 
|- id="2002 QX134" bgcolor=#fefefe
| 1 ||  || MBA-I || 18.6 || data-sort-value="0.57" | 570 m || multiple || 2002–2016 || 30 Oct 2016 || 37 || align=left | Disc.: NEAT || 
|- id="2002 QB135" bgcolor=#E9E9E9
| 0 ||  || MBA-M || 17.6 || 1.3 km || multiple || 2002–2020 || 08 Dec 2020 || 57 || align=left | Disc.: NEATAlt.: 2015 TA262 || 
|- id="2002 QE135" bgcolor=#E9E9E9
| 0 ||  = (351826) || MBA-M || 16.96 || 1.3 km || multiple || 2002-2022 || 03 May 2022 || 8 || align=left | Disc.: NEATAlt.: 2006 PF40  || 
|- id="2002 QJ135" bgcolor=#FA8072
| 2 ||  || HUN || 19.5 || data-sort-value="0.37" | 370 m || multiple || 2002–2020 || 09 Dec 2020 || 57 || align=left | Disc.: NEAT || 
|- id="2002 QM135" bgcolor=#E9E9E9
| 0 ||  || MBA-M || 17.8 || 1.2 km || multiple || 2002–2020 || 19 Jan 2020 || 113 || align=left | Disc.: NEAT || 
|- id="2002 QR135" bgcolor=#FA8072
| 3 ||  || MCA || 19.2 || data-sort-value="0.43" | 430 m || multiple || 2002–2020 || 23 Nov 2020 || 40 || align=left | Disc.: NEAT || 
|- id="2002 QS135" bgcolor=#fefefe
| 0 ||  || MBA-I || 18.4 || data-sort-value="0.62" | 620 m || multiple || 2002–2019 || 31 Dec 2019 || 62 || align=left | Disc.: NEAT || 
|- id="2002 QU135" bgcolor=#FA8072
| 2 ||  || HUN || 18.9 || data-sort-value="0.49" | 490 m || multiple || 2001–2016 || 31 Mar 2016 || 21 || align=left | Disc.: NEAT || 
|- id="2002 QX135" bgcolor=#E9E9E9
| 0 ||  || MBA-M || 17.9 || 1.1 km || multiple || 2002–2019 || 06 Sep 2019 || 127 || align=left | Disc.: NEAT || 
|- id="2002 QA136" bgcolor=#E9E9E9
| 0 ||  || MBA-M || 17.2 || 1.5 km || multiple || 2002–2020 || 14 Dec 2020 || 61 || align=left | Disc.: NEATAlt.: 2015 PS276 || 
|- id="2002 QC136" bgcolor=#E9E9E9
| 0 ||  || MBA-M || 16.87 || 1.8 km || multiple || 2001–2022 || 25 Jan 2022 || 209 || align=left | Disc.: NEAT || 
|- id="2002 QF136" bgcolor=#d6d6d6
| 4 ||  || MBA-O || 16.7 || 2.5 km || multiple || 2002–2018 || 05 Oct 2018 || 25 || align=left | Disc.: NEAT || 
|- id="2002 QG136" bgcolor=#E9E9E9
| 2 ||  || MBA-M || 18.4 || data-sort-value="0.73" | 620 m || multiple || 2002-2021 || 07 Jan 2021 || 35 || align=left | Disc.: NEAT || 4
|- id="2002 QH136" bgcolor=#E9E9E9
| 0 ||  || MBA-M || 17.9 || data-sort-value="0.78" | 780 m || multiple || 2002–2019 || 25 Nov 2019 || 32 || align=left | Disc.: NEAT || 
|- id="2002 QJ136" bgcolor=#E9E9E9
| 0 ||  || MBA-M || 17.23 || 2.8 km || multiple || 2000–2022 || 07 Jan 2022 || 175 || align=left | Disc.: NEATAlt.: 2009 BF120, 2010 OA58 || 
|- id="2002 QM136" bgcolor=#E9E9E9
| 0 ||  || MBA-M || 17.3 || 1.5 km || multiple || 2002–2020 || 19 Dec 2020 || 70 || align=left | Disc.: NEATAlt.: 2015 RU16 || 
|- id="2002 QQ136" bgcolor=#fefefe
| – ||  || MBA-I || 19.4 || data-sort-value="0.39" | 390 m || single || 24 days || 11 Sep 2002 || 7 || align=left | Disc.: NEAT || 
|- id="2002 QR136" bgcolor=#E9E9E9
| – ||  || MBA-M || 17.7 || 1.2 km || single || 19 days || 16 Sep 2002 || 8 || align=left | Disc.: NEAT || 
|- id="2002 QS136" bgcolor=#fefefe
| 0 ||  || MBA-I || 18.2 || data-sort-value="0.68" | 680 m || multiple || 2002–2020 || 17 Nov 2020 || 89 || align=left | Disc.: NEAT || 
|- id="2002 QV136" bgcolor=#E9E9E9
| 0 ||  || MBA-M || 17.50 || data-sort-value="0.94" | 940 m || multiple || 2002–2021 || 14 Apr 2021 || 115 || align=left | Disc.: NEAT || 
|- id="2002 QX136" bgcolor=#E9E9E9
| 1 ||  || MBA-M || 18.0 || data-sort-value="0.75" | 750 m || multiple || 1998–2019 || 06 Dec 2019 || 32 || align=left | Disc.: NEAT || 
|- id="2002 QY136" bgcolor=#fefefe
| 0 ||  || MBA-I || 18.66 || data-sort-value="0.55" | 550 m || multiple || 2002–2021 || 06 Apr 2021 || 61 || align=left | Disc.: NEAT || 
|- id="2002 QZ136" bgcolor=#d6d6d6
| 0 ||  || MBA-O || 16.78 || 2.5 km || multiple || 2002–2021 || 15 Apr 2021 || 112 || align=left | Disc.: NEATAlt.: 2013 WN48 || 
|- id="2002 QA137" bgcolor=#d6d6d6
| 0 ||  || MBA-O || 16.4 || 2.9 km || multiple || 2002–2020 || 19 Jan 2020 || 93 || align=left | Disc.: NEAT || 
|- id="2002 QB137" bgcolor=#E9E9E9
| 1 ||  || MBA-M || 18.82 || data-sort-value="0.72" | 720 m || multiple || 2002–2015 || 03 Nov 2015 || 41 || align=left | Disc.: NEAT || 
|- id="2002 QD137" bgcolor=#FA8072
| 2 ||  || MCA || 18.6 || data-sort-value="0.57" | 570 m || multiple || 2002–2016 || 27 Sep 2016 || 35 || align=left | Disc.: NEAT || 
|- id="2002 QF137" bgcolor=#E9E9E9
| 0 ||  || MBA-M || 17.5 || 1.3 km || multiple || 2002–2019 || 03 Oct 2019 || 55 || align=left | Disc.: NEATAlt.: 2014 KG34 || 
|- id="2002 QG137" bgcolor=#d6d6d6
| 0 ||  || MBA-O || 16.4 || 2.9 km || multiple || 2002–2021 || 14 Jan 2021 || 107 || align=left | Disc.: NEAT || 
|- id="2002 QH137" bgcolor=#d6d6d6
| 0 ||  || MBA-O || 16.04 || 3.4 km || multiple || 2002–2022 || 27 Jan 2022 || 78 || align=left | Disc.: NEATAlt.: 2010 EX18 || 
|- id="2002 QK137" bgcolor=#E9E9E9
| 0 ||  || MBA-M || 17.3 || 1.5 km || multiple || 2002–2020 || 17 Oct 2020 || 134 || align=left | Disc.: NEAT || 
|- id="2002 QL137" bgcolor=#d6d6d6
| 0 ||  || MBA-O || 16.5 || 2.8 km || multiple || 2002–2019 || 29 Dec 2019 || 101 || align=left | Disc.: NEATAlt.: 2007 LA16 || 
|- id="2002 QO137" bgcolor=#E9E9E9
| 0 ||  || MBA-M || 17.1 || 1.6 km || multiple || 2001–2021 || 18 Jan 2021 || 148 || align=left | Disc.: NEAT || 
|- id="2002 QS137" bgcolor=#E9E9E9
| 0 ||  || MBA-M || 17.4 || 1.4 km || multiple || 2002–2020 || 23 Nov 2020 || 75 || align=left | Disc.: NEATAlt.: 2011 SV167 || 
|- id="2002 QV137" bgcolor=#d6d6d6
| 0 ||  || MBA-O || 17.0 || 2.2 km || multiple || 2002–2019 || 20 Oct 2019 || 67 || align=left | Disc.: NEATAlt.: 2013 MJ11 || 
|- id="2002 QW137" bgcolor=#fefefe
| 1 ||  || MBA-I || 19.2 || data-sort-value="0.43" | 430 m || multiple || 2002–2019 || 21 Oct 2019 || 55 || align=left | Disc.: NEAT || 
|- id="2002 QA138" bgcolor=#fefefe
| 0 ||  || MBA-I || 18.6 || data-sort-value="0.57" | 570 m || multiple || 2002–2020 || 15 Aug 2020 || 67 || align=left | Disc.: NEATAlt.: 2006 VU91 || 
|- id="2002 QD138" bgcolor=#fefefe
| 1 ||  || MBA-I || 19.0 || data-sort-value="0.47" | 470 m || multiple || 2002–2020 || 16 Dec 2020 || 55 || align=left | Disc.: NEAT || 
|- id="2002 QH138" bgcolor=#fefefe
| 1 ||  || MBA-I || 17.2 || 1.1 km || multiple || 2002–2021 || 12 Aug 2021 || 63 || align=left | Disc.: NEATAlt.: 2010 LD157 || 
|- id="2002 QJ138" bgcolor=#d6d6d6
| 0 ||  || MBA-O || 16.3 || 3.1 km || multiple || 1994–2021 || 18 Jan 2021 || 127 || align=left | Disc.: NEAT || 
|- id="2002 QK138" bgcolor=#E9E9E9
| 0 ||  || MBA-M || 17.66 || data-sort-value="0.87" | 870 m || multiple || 2002–2021 || 08 May 2021 || 90 || align=left | Disc.: NEAT || 
|- id="2002 QL138" bgcolor=#E9E9E9
| 2 ||  || MBA-M || 17.7 || data-sort-value="0.86" | 860 m || multiple || 2002–2019 || 02 Dec 2019 || 64 || align=left | Disc.: NEAT || 
|- id="2002 QM138" bgcolor=#d6d6d6
| 0 ||  || MBA-O || 16.5 || 2.8 km || multiple || 2002–2021 || 09 Jan 2021 || 82 || align=left | Disc.: NEAT || 
|- id="2002 QN138" bgcolor=#fefefe
| 0 ||  || MBA-I || 18.5 || data-sort-value="0.59" | 590 m || multiple || 1995–2020 || 21 Oct 2020 || 137 || align=left | Disc.: NEATAlt.: 2006 XS73 || 
|- id="2002 QO138" bgcolor=#fefefe
| 0 ||  || MBA-I || 18.9 || data-sort-value="0.49" | 490 m || multiple || 2002–2019 || 25 Sep 2019 || 59 || align=left | Disc.: NEAT || 
|- id="2002 QS138" bgcolor=#d6d6d6
| 0 ||  || MBA-O || 16.3 || 3.1 km || multiple || 2002–2021 || 18 Jan 2021 || 98 || align=left | Disc.: NEAT || 
|- id="2002 QU138" bgcolor=#E9E9E9
| 0 ||  || MBA-M || 17.86 || 1.5 km || multiple || 2002–2021 || 25 Nov 2021 || 59 || align=left | Disc.: NEATAlt.: 2020 JZ9 || 
|- id="2002 QV138" bgcolor=#E9E9E9
| 0 ||  || MBA-M || 17.4 || data-sort-value="0.98" | 980 m || multiple || 1994–2019 || 25 Nov 2019 || 136 || align=left | Disc.: NEATAlt.: 2014 MO33 || 
|- id="2002 QX138" bgcolor=#fefefe
| 0 ||  || MBA-I || 18.85 || data-sort-value="0.50" | 500 m || multiple || 2002–2021 || 31 Oct 2021 || 77 || align=left | Disc.: NEAT || 
|- id="2002 QZ138" bgcolor=#E9E9E9
| 0 ||  || MBA-M || 18.1 || 1.0 km || multiple || 2002–2019 || 06 Sep 2019 || 100 || align=left | Disc.: NEAT || 
|- id="2002 QC139" bgcolor=#fefefe
| 0 ||  || HUN || 18.65 || data-sort-value="0.55" | 550 m || multiple || 2002–2022 || 24 Jan 2022 || 69 || align=left | Disc.: NEAT || 
|- id="2002 QD139" bgcolor=#d6d6d6
| 0 ||  || MBA-O || 16.6 || 2.7 km || multiple || 1997–2021 || 15 Jan 2021 || 71 || align=left | Disc.: NEATAlt.: 2013 PO33 || 
|- id="2002 QF139" bgcolor=#fefefe
| 1 ||  || MBA-I || 18.6 || data-sort-value="0.57" | 570 m || multiple || 2002–2019 || 29 Nov 2019 || 66 || align=left | Disc.: NEAT || 
|- id="2002 QH139" bgcolor=#E9E9E9
| 0 ||  || MBA-M || 17.3 || 1.0 km || multiple || 2001–2019 || 24 Dec 2019 || 77 || align=left | Disc.: NEAT || 
|- id="2002 QK139" bgcolor=#d6d6d6
| 1 ||  || MBA-O || 17.1 || 2.1 km || multiple || 2002–2021 || 11 Jan 2021 || 33 || align=left | Disc.: NEAT || 
|- id="2002 QZ139" bgcolor=#fefefe
| 0 ||  || MBA-I || 18.10 || data-sort-value="0.71" | 710 m || multiple || 2002–2021 || 15 Apr 2021 || 114 || align=left | Disc.: NEAT || 
|- id="2002 QB140" bgcolor=#fefefe
| 1 ||  || MBA-I || 19.1 || data-sort-value="0.45" | 450 m || multiple || 2002–2020 || 22 Apr 2020 || 49 || align=left | Disc.: NEAT || 
|- id="2002 QD140" bgcolor=#E9E9E9
| 3 ||  || MBA-M || 18.1 || data-sort-value="0.71" | 710 m || multiple || 1998–2010 || 04 Jul 2010 || 28 || align=left | Disc.: NEAT || 
|- id="2002 QJ140" bgcolor=#d6d6d6
| 0 ||  || MBA-O || 17.02 || 2.2 km || multiple || 2002–2022 || 25 Jan 2022 || 73 || align=left | Disc.: NEATAlt.: 2014 WV156 || 
|- id="2002 QO140" bgcolor=#fefefe
| 1 ||  || MBA-I || 18.8 || data-sort-value="0.52" | 520 m || multiple || 2002–2020 || 24 Jun 2020 || 100 || align=left | Disc.: NEAT || 
|- id="2002 QP140" bgcolor=#d6d6d6
| 0 ||  || MBA-O || 16.6 || 2.7 km || multiple || 2002–2018 || 02 Nov 2018 || 129 || align=left | Disc.: NEATAlt.: 2006 HU150 || 
|- id="2002 QR140" bgcolor=#d6d6d6
| 0 ||  || MBA-O || 16.4 || 2.9 km || multiple || 2002–2020 || 20 Nov 2020 || 97 || align=left | Disc.: NEAT || 
|- id="2002 QU140" bgcolor=#d6d6d6
| 0 ||  || MBA-O || 16.7 || 2.5 km || multiple || 2002–2021 || 17 Jan 2021 || 96 || align=left | Disc.: NEAT || 
|- id="2002 QY140" bgcolor=#fefefe
| 0 ||  || HUN || 18.01 || data-sort-value="0.74" | 740 m || multiple || 2002–2021 || 14 May 2021 || 157 || align=left | Disc.: NEAT || 
|- id="2002 QA141" bgcolor=#E9E9E9
| 3 ||  || MBA-M || 17.8 || data-sort-value="0.82" | 820 m || multiple || 2002–2015 || 03 Dec 2015 || 30 || align=left | Disc.: NEATAlt.: 2006 PW42 || 
|- id="2002 QC141" bgcolor=#fefefe
| 0 ||  || HUN || 18.2 || data-sort-value="0.68" | 680 m || multiple || 2002–2020 || 14 Sep 2020 || 121 || align=left | Disc.: AMOS || 
|- id="2002 QE141" bgcolor=#d6d6d6
| 0 ||  || MBA-O || 16.26 || 3.1 km || multiple || 2002–2022 || 27 Jan 2022 || 167 || align=left | Disc.: AMOSAlt.: 2010 GE79 || 
|- id="2002 QG141" bgcolor=#E9E9E9
| 0 ||  || MBA-M || 17.9 || data-sort-value="0.78" | 780 m || multiple || 1998–2020 || 15 Feb 2020 || 114 || align=left | Disc.: LINEARAlt.: 1998 UP42 || 
|- id="2002 QH141" bgcolor=#d6d6d6
| – ||  || MBA-O || 17.2 || 2.0 km || single || 26 days || 15 Sep 2002 || 15 || align=left | Disc.: NEAT || 
|- id="2002 QJ141" bgcolor=#fefefe
| 3 ||  || MBA-I || 18.8 || data-sort-value="0.52" | 520 m || multiple || 2002–2019 || 09 May 2019 || 33 || align=left | Disc.: NEATAlt.: 2016 PX195 || 
|- id="2002 QK141" bgcolor=#fefefe
| 0 ||  || MBA-I || 18.1 || data-sort-value="0.71" | 710 m || multiple || 2002–2017 || 27 May 2017 || 36 || align=left | Disc.: NEAT || 
|- id="2002 QL141" bgcolor=#E9E9E9
| 3 ||  || MBA-M || 18.1 || data-sort-value="0.71" | 710 m || multiple || 2002–2018 || 15 Jun 2018 || 27 || align=left | Disc.: NEAT || 
|- id="2002 QM141" bgcolor=#fefefe
| 0 ||  || MBA-I || 18.5 || data-sort-value="0.59" | 590 m || multiple || 2002–2019 || 29 Oct 2019 || 158 || align=left | Disc.: NEATAlt.: 2009 UT43 || 
|- id="2002 QN141" bgcolor=#d6d6d6
| 0 ||  || MBA-O || 16.87 || 2.4 km || multiple || 2002–2021 || 09 Apr 2021 || 52 || align=left | Disc.: NEAT || 
|- id="2002 QP141" bgcolor=#d6d6d6
| 0 ||  || MBA-O || 16.8 || 2.4 km || multiple || 2002–2021 || 15 Jan 2021 || 106 || align=left | Disc.: NEAT || 
|- id="2002 QQ141" bgcolor=#d6d6d6
| 0 ||  || MBA-O || 16.2 || 3.2 km || multiple || 2002–2019 || 24 Oct 2019 || 74 || align=left | Disc.: NEAT || 
|- id="2002 QT141" bgcolor=#E9E9E9
| 0 ||  || MBA-M || 17.9 || data-sort-value="0.78" | 780 m || multiple || 2002–2019 || 28 Dec 2019 || 65 || align=left | Disc.: NEATAlt.: 2015 XC121 || 
|- id="2002 QU141" bgcolor=#d6d6d6
| 0 ||  || MBA-O || 16.4 || 2.9 km || multiple || 2002–2021 || 04 Jan 2021 || 115 || align=left | Disc.: NEATAlt.: 2013 PH4 || 
|- id="2002 QV141" bgcolor=#fefefe
| 0 ||  || MBA-I || 18.9 || data-sort-value="0.49" | 490 m || multiple || 2002–2020 || 07 Dec 2020 || 42 || align=left | Disc.: NEAT || 
|- id="2002 QW141" bgcolor=#d6d6d6
| 0 ||  || MBA-O || 16.04 || 3.4 km || multiple || 2002–2021 || 08 Apr 2021 || 188 || align=left | Disc.: NEATAlt.: 2008 RJ116 || 
|- id="2002 QX141" bgcolor=#fefefe
| 1 ||  || MBA-I || 18.7 || data-sort-value="0.54" | 540 m || multiple || 2002–2020 || 23 Oct 2020 || 25 || align=left | Disc.: NEAT || 
|- id="2002 QZ141" bgcolor=#E9E9E9
| 0 ||  || MBA-M || 17.7 || data-sort-value="0.86" | 860 m || multiple || 2002–2020 || 23 Mar 2020 || 116 || align=left | Disc.: NEATAlt.: 2006 RY13, 2010 PB60 || 
|- id="2002 QA142" bgcolor=#E9E9E9
| 1 ||  || MBA-M || 18.0 || 1.1 km || multiple || 2002–2020 || 24 Dec 2020 || 62 || align=left | Disc.: NEATAlt.: 2008 AQ13 || 
|- id="2002 QB142" bgcolor=#E9E9E9
| 1 ||  || MBA-M || 17.8 || 1.2 km || multiple || 2002–2019 || 01 Oct 2019 || 48 || align=left | Disc.: NEAT || 
|- id="2002 QC142" bgcolor=#E9E9E9
| 1 ||  || MBA-M || 17.9 || data-sort-value="0.78" | 780 m || multiple || 2002–2020 || 22 Jan 2020 || 36 || align=left | Disc.: NEAT || 
|- id="2002 QD142" bgcolor=#d6d6d6
| 0 ||  || MBA-O || 17.1 || 2.1 km || multiple || 2002–2018 || 13 Sep 2018 || 46 || align=left | Disc.: NEATAlt.: 2015 AK66 || 
|- id="2002 QJ142" bgcolor=#d6d6d6
| 2 ||  || MBA-O || 17.2 || 2.0 km || multiple || 2002–2019 || 05 Nov 2019 || 29 || align=left | Disc.: NEAT || 
|- id="2002 QK142" bgcolor=#E9E9E9
| 1 ||  || MBA-M || 17.5 || data-sort-value="0.94" | 940 m || multiple || 2002–2020 || 29 Jan 2020 || 65 || align=left | Disc.: NEATAlt.: 2006 QY97 || 
|- id="2002 QL142" bgcolor=#fefefe
| 0 ||  || MBA-I || 17.6 || data-sort-value="0.90" | 900 m || multiple || 2002–2020 || 11 Dec 2020 || 97 || align=left | Disc.: NEAT || 
|- id="2002 QR142" bgcolor=#d6d6d6
| 0 ||  || MBA-O || 16.1 || 3.4 km || multiple || 2002–2020 || 16 Feb 2020 || 192 || align=left | Disc.: NEAT || 
|- id="2002 QS142" bgcolor=#d6d6d6
| 0 ||  || MBA-O || 16.8 || 2.4 km || multiple || 2002–2019 || 05 Nov 2019 || 54 || align=left | Disc.: NEAT || 
|- id="2002 QT142" bgcolor=#d6d6d6
| – ||  || MBA-O || 17.4 || 1.8 km || single || 16 days || 12 Sep 2002 || 9 || align=left | Disc.: NEAT || 
|- id="2002 QV142" bgcolor=#d6d6d6
| 0 ||  || MBA-O || 16.52 || 2.8 km || multiple || 2002–2021 || 17 Apr 2021 || 151 || align=left | Disc.: NEAT || 
|- id="2002 QW142" bgcolor=#d6d6d6
| 0 ||  || MBA-O || 16.97 || 2.2 km || multiple || 2002–2021 || 03 Apr 2021 || 76 || align=left | Disc.: NEATAlt.: 2008 UM350 || 
|- id="2002 QX142" bgcolor=#E9E9E9
| 0 ||  || MBA-M || 17.2 || 1.5 km || multiple || 2002–2021 || 12 Jan 2021 || 77 || align=left | Disc.: NEAT || 
|- id="2002 QZ142" bgcolor=#d6d6d6
| 0 ||  || MBA-O || 16.3 || 3.1 km || multiple || 2002–2021 || 06 Jun 2021 || 194 || align=left | Disc.: NEAT || 
|- id="2002 QA143" bgcolor=#E9E9E9
| 0 ||  || MBA-M || 17.22 || 2.0 km || multiple || 2002–2022 || 04 Jan 2022 || 102 || align=left | Disc.: NEAT || 
|- id="2002 QD143" bgcolor=#E9E9E9
| 0 ||  || MBA-M || 18.00 || data-sort-value="0.75" | 750 m || multiple || 2002–2021 || 09 Apr 2021 || 77 || align=left | Disc.: NEATAlt.: 2006 SA28 || 
|- id="2002 QE143" bgcolor=#fefefe
| 0 ||  || MBA-I || 18.46 || data-sort-value="0.60" | 600 m || multiple || 2000–2021 || 04 Dec 2021 || 56 || align=left | Disc.: SpacewatchAlt.: 2000 BJ41 || 
|- id="2002 QH143" bgcolor=#E9E9E9
| 0 ||  || MBA-M || 17.5 || 1.3 km || multiple || 2002–2021 || 18 Jan 2021 || 70 || align=left | Disc.: NEAT || 
|- id="2002 QL143" bgcolor=#fefefe
| 2 ||  || MBA-I || 18.3 || data-sort-value="0.65" | 650 m || multiple || 2002–2010 || 13 Nov 2010 || 47 || align=left | Disc.: NEATAlt.: 2010 OJ89 || 
|- id="2002 QP143" bgcolor=#E9E9E9
| 0 ||  || MBA-M || 17.3 || 1.5 km || multiple || 2002–2019 || 29 Nov 2019 || 70 || align=left | Disc.: NEATAlt.: 2015 UC63 || 
|- id="2002 QS143" bgcolor=#d6d6d6
| 0 ||  || MBA-O || 16.5 || 2.8 km || multiple || 2002–2021 || 17 Jan 2021 || 145 || align=left | Disc.: NEATAlt.: 2013 QK12 || 
|- id="2002 QT143" bgcolor=#d6d6d6
| 0 ||  || MBA-O || 17.13 || 2.1 km || multiple || 2002–2021 || 15 Apr 2021 || 86 || align=left | Disc.: NEAT || 
|- id="2002 QU143" bgcolor=#d6d6d6
| 0 ||  || MBA-O || 16.8 || 2.4 km || multiple || 2000–2021 || 18 Jan 2021 || 69 || align=left | Disc.: NEAT || 
|- id="2002 QV143" bgcolor=#d6d6d6
| 1 ||  || MBA-O || 17.0 || 2.2 km || multiple || 2002–2018 || 14 Sep 2018 || 55 || align=left | Disc.: NEAT || 
|- id="2002 QW143" bgcolor=#E9E9E9
| 0 ||  || MBA-M || 18.04 || data-sort-value="0.73" | 730 m || multiple || 2002–2021 || 15 Apr 2021 || 56 || align=left | Disc.: NEATAlt.: 2014 NS33 || 
|- id="2002 QY143" bgcolor=#d6d6d6
| 3 ||  || MBA-O || 16.9 || 2.3 km || multiple || 2002–2018 || 13 Sep 2018 || 37 || align=left | Disc.: NEAT || 
|- id="2002 QZ143" bgcolor=#fefefe
| 0 ||  || MBA-I || 18.2 || data-sort-value="0.68" | 680 m || multiple || 2002–2019 || 25 Jul 2019 || 84 || align=left | Disc.: NEAT || 
|- id="2002 QA144" bgcolor=#d6d6d6
| 0 ||  || MBA-O || 17.02 || 2.2 km || multiple || 2002–2021 || 01 May 2021 || 163 || align=left | Disc.: NEAT || 
|- id="2002 QB144" bgcolor=#E9E9E9
| 0 ||  || MBA-M || 17.2 || 2.5 km || multiple || 2002–2021 || 13 Jan 2021 || 100 || align=left | Disc.: NEATAlt.: 2005 EU110, 2010 FW65 || 
|- id="2002 QD144" bgcolor=#fefefe
| 0 ||  || MBA-I || 18.6 || data-sort-value="0.57" | 570 m || multiple || 2002–2020 || 15 Dec 2020 || 65 || align=left | Disc.: NEAT || 
|- id="2002 QF144" bgcolor=#E9E9E9
| 0 ||  || MBA-M || 17.63 || 1.3 km || multiple || 1994–2019 || 03 Oct 2019 || 344 || align=left | Disc.: NEAT || 
|- id="2002 QH144" bgcolor=#E9E9E9
| 0 ||  || MBA-M || 18.00 || data-sort-value="0.75" | 750 m || multiple || 2002–2021 || 15 Apr 2021 || 67 || align=left | Disc.: NEATAlt.: 2008 AO71 || 
|- id="2002 QM144" bgcolor=#d6d6d6
| 3 ||  || MBA-O || 17.7 || 1.6 km || multiple || 2002–2018 || 08 Nov 2018 || 32 || align=left | Disc.: NEAT || 
|- id="2002 QN144" bgcolor=#E9E9E9
| 0 ||  || MBA-M || 16.87 || 1.3 km || multiple || 2002–2021 || 13 May 2021 || 197 || align=left | Disc.: NEATAlt.: 2014 OF250 || 
|- id="2002 QP144" bgcolor=#d6d6d6
| 0 ||  || MBA-O || 17.1 || 2.1 km || multiple || 2002–2020 || 24 Dec 2020 || 60 || align=left | Disc.: NEAT || 
|- id="2002 QR144" bgcolor=#E9E9E9
| 0 ||  || MBA-M || 17.01 || 1.7 km || multiple || 2002–2022 || 26 Jan 2022 || 73 || align=left | Disc.: NEAT || 
|- id="2002 QT144" bgcolor=#d6d6d6
| 0 ||  || MBA-O || 17.2 || 2.0 km || multiple || 2002–2019 || 03 Dec 2019 || 43 || align=left | Disc.: NEATAdded on 22 July 2020 || 
|- id="2002 QU144" bgcolor=#fefefe
| 0 ||  || MBA-I || 18.71 || data-sort-value="0.54" | 540 m || multiple || 2002–2021 || 06 Oct 2021 || 88 || align=left | Disc.: NEATAlt.: 2013 MP8 || 
|- id="2002 QW144" bgcolor=#fefefe
| 0 ||  || MBA-I || 18.4 || data-sort-value="0.62" | 620 m || multiple || 2002–2021 || 06 Jan 2021 || 51 || align=left | Disc.: NEAT || 
|- id="2002 QY144" bgcolor=#d6d6d6
| 0 ||  || MBA-O || 16.71 || 2.5 km || multiple || 2002–2021 || 09 Apr 2021 || 131 || align=left | Disc.: NEAT || 
|- id="2002 QZ144" bgcolor=#fefefe
| 0 ||  || MBA-I || 18.3 || data-sort-value="0.65" | 650 m || multiple || 2002–2019 || 27 Oct 2019 || 88 || align=left | Disc.: NEATAlt.: 2009 UR56 || 
|- id="2002 QA145" bgcolor=#fefefe
| 0 ||  || MBA-I || 18.7 || data-sort-value="0.54" | 540 m || multiple || 1999–2020 || 30 Jan 2020 || 48 || align=left | Disc.: NEATAlt.: 2020 BK70 || 
|- id="2002 QC145" bgcolor=#fefefe
| 3 ||  || MBA-I || 19.5 || data-sort-value="0.37" | 370 m || multiple || 2002–2012 || 05 Nov 2012 || 24 || align=left | Disc.: NEAT || 
|- id="2002 QE145" bgcolor=#d6d6d6
| 0 ||  || MBA-O || 16.4 || 2.9 km || multiple || 2002–2021 || 18 Jan 2021 || 64 || align=left | Disc.: NEATAlt.: 2014 WT423 || 
|- id="2002 QF145" bgcolor=#d6d6d6
| 0 ||  || MBA-O || 15.9 || 3.7 km || multiple || 2002–2020 || 17 Nov 2020 || 184 || align=left | Disc.: NEATAlt.: 2008 UX95 || 
|- id="2002 QJ145" bgcolor=#d6d6d6
| 0 ||  || MBA-O || 16.7 || 2.5 km || multiple || 2002–2020 || 23 Jan 2020 || 98 || align=left | Disc.: NEAT || 
|- id="2002 QN145" bgcolor=#E9E9E9
| 0 ||  || MBA-M || 18.13 || data-sort-value="0.70" | 700 m || multiple || 2002–2021 || 15 Apr 2021 || 49 || align=left | Disc.: NEATAlt.: 2014 OS183 || 
|- id="2002 QP145" bgcolor=#FA8072
| – ||  || MCA || 19.9 || data-sort-value="0.31" | 310 m || single || 27 days || 16 Sep 2002 || 13 || align=left | Disc.: NEAT || 
|- id="2002 QR145" bgcolor=#d6d6d6
| 0 ||  || MBA-O || 16.27 || 3.1 km || multiple || 2002–2021 || 15 Apr 2021 || 232 || align=left | Disc.: NEATAlt.: 2010 HZ102 || 
|- id="2002 QT145" bgcolor=#E9E9E9
| 0 ||  || MBA-M || 17.1 || 1.6 km || multiple || 2002–2020 || 17 Oct 2020 || 101 || align=left | Disc.: NEAT || 
|- id="2002 QV145" bgcolor=#E9E9E9
| 0 ||  || MBA-M || 18.0 || 1.1 km || multiple || 1998–2019 || 26 Nov 2019 || 108 || align=left | Disc.: NEATAlt.: 2015 TN172 || 
|- id="2002 QW145" bgcolor=#d6d6d6
| 0 ||  || MBA-O || 16.6 || 2.7 km || multiple || 2002–2020 || 20 May 2020 || 162 || align=left | Disc.: NEATAlt.: 2015 FW121 || 
|- id="2002 QX145" bgcolor=#fefefe
| 4 ||  || MBA-I || 19.3 || data-sort-value="0.41" | 410 m || multiple || 2002–2016 || 08 Aug 2016 || 26 || align=left | Disc.: NEAT || 
|- id="2002 QY145" bgcolor=#d6d6d6
| 0 ||  || MBA-O || 17.2 || 2.0 km || multiple || 2002–2021 || 09 Jun 2021 || 144 || align=left | Disc.: NEAT || 
|- id="2002 QZ145" bgcolor=#fefefe
| 1 ||  || MBA-I || 18.8 || data-sort-value="0.52" | 520 m || multiple || 2002–2019 || 24 Oct 2019 || 39 || align=left | Disc.: NEAT || 
|- id="2002 QD146" bgcolor=#fefefe
| 0 ||  || MBA-I || 18.3 || data-sort-value="0.65" | 650 m || multiple || 2002–2019 || 27 Oct 2019 || 104 || align=left | Disc.: NEAT || 
|- id="2002 QE146" bgcolor=#E9E9E9
| 0 ||  || MBA-M || 17.4 || 1.4 km || multiple || 2002–2021 || 06 Jan 2021 || 105 || align=left | Disc.: NEAT || 
|- id="2002 QF146" bgcolor=#fefefe
| 0 ||  || MBA-I || 18.3 || data-sort-value="0.65" | 650 m || multiple || 2002–2018 || 16 Jan 2018 || 109 || align=left | Disc.: NEAT || 
|- id="2002 QH146" bgcolor=#E9E9E9
| 1 ||  || MBA-M || 17.8 || 1.2 km || multiple || 2002–2017 || 03 Jan 2017 || 52 || align=left | Disc.: NEATAlt.: 2015 NO19 || 
|- id="2002 QO146" bgcolor=#fefefe
| 0 ||  || MBA-I || 18.45 || data-sort-value="0.61" | 610 m || multiple || 1995–2022 || 25 Jan 2022 || 73 || align=left | Disc.: NEAT || 
|- id="2002 QR146" bgcolor=#fefefe
| 0 ||  || MBA-I || 18.2 || data-sort-value="0.68" | 680 m || multiple || 1995–2019 || 05 Jun 2019 || 75 || align=left | Disc.: NEAT || 
|- id="2002 QW146" bgcolor=#d6d6d6
| 0 ||  || MBA-O || 16.9 || 2.3 km || multiple || 2002–2019 || 29 Oct 2019 || 53 || align=left | Disc.: NEAT || 
|- id="2002 QX146" bgcolor=#E9E9E9
| 0 ||  || MBA-M || 16.8 || 1.3 km || multiple || 2002–2021 || 15 Jan 2021 || 170 || align=left | Disc.: NEAT || 
|- id="2002 QY146" bgcolor=#E9E9E9
| 0 ||  || MBA-M || 17.33 || 1.4 km || multiple || 2002–2022 || 26 Jan 2022 || 149 || align=left | Disc.: NEAT || 
|- id="2002 QZ146" bgcolor=#d6d6d6
| 1 ||  || MBA-O || 17.3 || 1.9 km || multiple || 2002–2019 || 28 Nov 2019 || 47 || align=left | Disc.: NEATAdded on 22 July 2020Alt.: 2019 SW45 || 
|- id="2002 QB147" bgcolor=#d6d6d6
| 0 ||  || MBA-O || 16.84 || 2.4 km || multiple || 2002–2021 || 15 Apr 2021 || 91 || align=left | Disc.: NEATAlt.: 2016 EL166 || 
|- id="2002 QH147" bgcolor=#E9E9E9
| 0 ||  || MBA-M || 17.53 || 1.7 km || multiple || 2002–2022 || 25 Jan 2022 || 115 || align=left | Disc.: NEATAlt.: 2007 UR93, 2009 BM152 || 
|- id="2002 QJ147" bgcolor=#d6d6d6
| 0 ||  || MBA-O || 16.43 || 2.9 km || multiple || 2002–2021 || 06 May 2021 || 180 || align=left | Disc.: NEATAlt.: 2010 AX11 || 
|- id="2002 QK147" bgcolor=#E9E9E9
| 2 ||  || MBA-M || 17.9 || 1.5 km || multiple || 2002–2016 || 25 Oct 2016 || 39 || align=left | Disc.: NEAT || 
|- id="2002 QO147" bgcolor=#E9E9E9
| 2 ||  || MBA-M || 18.47 || data-sort-value="0.54" | 600 m || multiple || 2002-2022 || 04 Jul 2022 || 25 || align=left | Disc.: NEAT || 
|- id="2002 QV147" bgcolor=#fefefe
| 0 ||  || MBA-I || 17.8 || data-sort-value="0.82" | 820 m || multiple || 2002–2021 || 11 Jan 2021 || 200 || align=left | Disc.: NEATAlt.: 2011 BM50 || 
|- id="2002 QY147" bgcolor=#fefefe
| 1 ||  || MBA-I || 18.6 || data-sort-value="0.57" | 570 m || multiple || 2002–2019 || 29 Nov 2019 || 71 || align=left | Disc.: NEAT || 
|- id="2002 QC148" bgcolor=#E9E9E9
| 0 ||  || MBA-M || 17.4 || 1.8 km || multiple || 2002–2020 || 15 Oct 2020 || 121 || align=left | Disc.: NEATAlt.: 2010 MY130 || 
|- id="2002 QG148" bgcolor=#d6d6d6
| 0 ||  || MBA-O || 16.18 || 3.2 km || multiple || 2002–2022 || 23 Jan 2022 || 134 || align=left | Disc.: NEATAlt.: 2008 SS311 || 
|- id="2002 QJ148" bgcolor=#d6d6d6
| 0 ||  || MBA-O || 16.3 || 3.1 km || multiple || 2002–2021 || 22 Jan 2021 || 95 || align=left | Disc.: NEAT || 
|- id="2002 QQ148" bgcolor=#d6d6d6
| 0 ||  || MBA-O || 16.8 || 2.4 km || multiple || 1997–2018 || 01 Nov 2018 || 68 || align=left | Disc.: Cerro TololoAlt.: 2001 FW195, 2008 VA64, 2011 FN91 || 
|- id="2002 QR148" bgcolor=#d6d6d6
| 0 ||  || MBA-O || 17.5 || 1.8 km || multiple || 2002–2018 || 06 Oct 2018 || 45 || align=left | Disc.: NEAT || 
|- id="2002 QS148" bgcolor=#d6d6d6
| 0 ||  || MBA-O || 16.8 || 2.4 km || multiple || 2001–2019 || 23 Oct 2019 || 76 || align=left | Disc.: NEATAlt.: 2016 CG165 || 
|- id="2002 QU148" bgcolor=#fefefe
| 0 ||  || MBA-I || 18.6 || data-sort-value="0.57" | 570 m || multiple || 2002–2017 || 20 Jun 2017 || 52 || align=left | Disc.: NEAT || 
|- id="2002 QY148" bgcolor=#E9E9E9
| 1 ||  || MBA-M || 18.0 || data-sort-value="0.75" | 750 m || multiple || 2002–2019 || 24 Dec 2019 || 62 || align=left | Disc.: NEAT || 
|- id="2002 QA149" bgcolor=#d6d6d6
| 0 ||  || MBA-O || 16.1 || 3.4 km || multiple || 2002–2020 || 03 Jan 2020 || 128 || align=left | Disc.: NEAT || 
|- id="2002 QG149" bgcolor=#fefefe
| 0 ||  || MBA-I || 17.5 || data-sort-value="0.94" | 940 m || multiple || 1998–2021 || 10 Jan 2021 || 198 || align=left | Disc.: NEAT || 
|- id="2002 QK149" bgcolor=#E9E9E9
| 0 ||  || MBA-M || 17.6 || 1.3 km || multiple || 2002–2021 || 18 Jan 2021 || 130 || align=left | Disc.: NEATAlt.: 2015 PB309 || 
|- id="2002 QL149" bgcolor=#fefefe
| 1 ||  || MBA-I || 18.4 || data-sort-value="0.62" | 620 m || multiple || 2002–2020 || 16 Oct 2020 || 45 || align=left | Disc.: NEAT || 
|- id="2002 QM149" bgcolor=#E9E9E9
| 0 ||  || MBA-M || 17.5 || data-sort-value="0.94" | 940 m || multiple || 2002–2021 || 07 Jan 2021 || 100 || align=left | Disc.: NEAT || 
|- id="2002 QN149" bgcolor=#d6d6d6
| 0 ||  || MBA-O || 16.40 || 2.9 km || multiple || 2002–2021 || 14 Apr 2021 || 130 || align=left | Disc.: NEAT || 
|- id="2002 QP149" bgcolor=#fefefe
| 1 ||  || MBA-I || 19.59 || data-sort-value="0.36" | 360 m || multiple || 2002-2022 || 17 Nov 2022 || 60 || align=left | Disc.: NEAT || 
|- id="2002 QT149" bgcolor=#d6d6d6
| 0 ||  || MBA-O || 16.5 || 2.8 km || multiple || 2002–2021 || 06 Jan 2021 || 128 || align=left | Disc.: NEATAlt.: 2011 BR130 || 
|- id="2002 QU149" bgcolor=#d6d6d6
| 1 ||  || MBA-O || 17.51 || 1.7 km || multiple || 2002-2022 || 01 Dec 2022 || 36 || align=left | Disc.: NEAT || 
|- id="2002 QW149" bgcolor=#d6d6d6
| 0 ||  || MBA-O || 16.4 || 2.9 km || multiple || 2002–2019 || 25 Oct 2019 || 100 || align=left | Disc.: NEAT || 
|- id="2002 QA150" bgcolor=#E9E9E9
| 0 ||  || MBA-M || 17.7 || 1.2 km || multiple || 2002–2019 || 27 Nov 2019 || 181 || align=left | Disc.: NEAT || 
|- id="2002 QC150" bgcolor=#fefefe
| 0 ||  || MBA-I || 17.8 || data-sort-value="0.82" | 820 m || multiple || 2002–2021 || 02 Jan 2021 || 191 || align=left | Disc.: NEAT || 
|- id="2002 QE150" bgcolor=#fefefe
| 0 ||  || MBA-I || 17.3 || 1.0 km || multiple || 2002–2020 || 16 Nov 2020 || 191 || align=left | Disc.: NEAT || 
|- id="2002 QF150" bgcolor=#fefefe
| 0 ||  || MBA-I || 18.40 || data-sort-value="0.62" | 620 m || multiple || 2002–2021 || 11 Oct 2021 || 69 || align=left | Disc.: NEATAlt.: 2010 VT154 || 
|- id="2002 QH150" bgcolor=#d6d6d6
| 0 ||  || MBA-O || 17.47 || 1.8 km || multiple || 2002–2021 || 15 Apr 2021 || 28 || align=left | Disc.: NEAT || 
|- id="2002 QK150" bgcolor=#d6d6d6
| 0 ||  || MBA-O || 16.69 || 2.6 km || multiple || 2002–2021 || 03 May 2021 || 55 || align=left | Disc.: NEATAlt.: 2006 KK101 || 
|- id="2002 QO150" bgcolor=#d6d6d6
| 0 ||  || MBA-O || 16.6 || 2.7 km || multiple || 2002–2021 || 18 Jan 2021 || 113 || align=left | Disc.: NEAT || 
|- id="2002 QR150" bgcolor=#fefefe
| 0 ||  || MBA-I || 18.9 || data-sort-value="0.49" | 490 m || multiple || 2002–2021 || 08 Jun 2021 || 55 || align=left | Disc.: NEAT || 
|- id="2002 QT150" bgcolor=#d6d6d6
| 0 ||  || MBA-O || 16.0 || 3.5 km || multiple || 2002–2019 || 01 Nov 2019 || 124 || align=left | Disc.: NEATAlt.: 2005 EL332, 2012 LQ13 || 
|- id="2002 QV150" bgcolor=#d6d6d6
| – ||  || MBA-O || 16.8 || 2.4 km || single || 11 days || 29 Aug 2002 || 8 || align=left | Disc.: NEAT || 
|- id="2002 QW150" bgcolor=#d6d6d6
| 0 ||  || MBA-O || 16.12 || 3.3 km || multiple || 2002–2021 || 11 May 2021 || 269 || align=left | Disc.: NEAT || 
|- id="2002 QY150" bgcolor=#fefefe
| 0 ||  || MBA-I || 18.55 || data-sort-value="0.58" | 580 m || multiple || 2001–2021 || 15 Apr 2021 || 103 || align=left | Disc.: NEAT || 
|- id="2002 QZ150" bgcolor=#fefefe
| 0 ||  || MBA-I || 17.6 || data-sort-value="0.90" | 900 m || multiple || 2002–2020 || 11 Nov 2020 || 125 || align=left | Disc.: NEATAlt.: 2009 OG18 || 
|- id="2002 QD151" bgcolor=#d6d6d6
| 0 ||  || HIL || 15.39 || 4.7 km || multiple || 2002–2022 || 07 Jan 2022 || 159 || align=left | Disc.: NEATAlt.: 2007 DO84, 2010 NV103, 2010 TN12 || 
|- id="2002 QE151" bgcolor=#d6d6d6
| 0 ||  || MBA-O || 15.8 || 3.9 km || multiple || 2002–2021 || 15 Jan 2021 || 238 || align=left | Disc.: NEATAlt.: 2008 UV310, 2010 CQ25 || 
|- id="2002 QG151" bgcolor=#E9E9E9
| 0 ||  || MBA-M || 17.48 || 1.8 km || multiple || 2002–2022 || 25 Jan 2022 || 103 || align=left | Disc.: NEATAlt.: 2011 SJ18 || 
|- id="2002 QH151" bgcolor=#d6d6d6
| 1 ||  || MBA-O || 17.9 || 1.5 km || multiple || 2002–2018 || 29 Nov 2018 || 64 || align=left | Disc.: NEAT || 
|- id="2002 QJ151" bgcolor=#E9E9E9
| – ||  || MBA-M || 18.5 || data-sort-value="0.59" | 590 m || single || 27 days || 13 Sep 2002 || 8 || align=left | Disc.: NEAT || 
|- id="2002 QK151" bgcolor=#d6d6d6
| 0 ||  || MBA-O || 15.7 || 4.0 km || multiple || 2002–2021 || 05 Oct 2021 || 148 || align=left | Disc.: NEATAlt.: 2010 BK50 || 
|- id="2002 QL151" bgcolor=#E9E9E9
| 0 ||  || MBA-M || 17.6 || data-sort-value="0.90" | 900 m || multiple || 2002–2018 || 13 Aug 2018 || 94 || align=left | Disc.: NEAT || 
|- id="2002 QO151" bgcolor=#E9E9E9
| 0 ||  || MBA-M || 16.77 || 2.7 km || multiple || 1997–2022 || 25 Jan 2022 || 238 || align=left | Disc.: NEATAlt.: 2010 MZ95, 2011 SP108 || 
|- id="2002 QQ151" bgcolor=#fefefe
| 0 ||  || MBA-I || 18.4 || data-sort-value="0.62" | 620 m || multiple || 2002–2019 || 04 Dec 2019 || 102 || align=left | Disc.: NEATAlt.: 2009 WB72 || 
|- id="2002 QS151" bgcolor=#fefefe
| 0 ||  || MBA-I || 18.0 || data-sort-value="0.75" | 750 m || multiple || 2002–2020 || 21 Sep 2020 || 129 || align=left | Disc.: NEATAlt.: 2005 EX220 || 
|- id="2002 QT151" bgcolor=#d6d6d6
| 0 ||  || MBA-O || 16.57 || 2.7 km || multiple || 2002–2021 || 01 May 2021 || 111 || align=left | Disc.: NEAT || 
|- id="2002 QU151" bgcolor=#d6d6d6
| 4 ||  || MBA-O || 18.4 || 1.2 km || single || 68 days || 12 Sep 2002 || 18 || align=left | Disc.: NEAT || 
|- id="2002 QV151" bgcolor=#d6d6d6
| 0 ||  || MBA-O || 16.2 || 3.2 km || multiple || 2002–2021 || 11 Jan 2021 || 139 || align=left | Disc.: NEAT || 
|- id="2002 QZ151" bgcolor=#E9E9E9
| 0 ||  || MBA-M || 17.5 || data-sort-value="0.94" | 940 m || multiple || 2002–2019 || 19 Nov 2019 || 126 || align=left | Disc.: NEAT || 
|- id="2002 QA152" bgcolor=#E9E9E9
| 0 ||  || MBA-M || 17.5 || 1.3 km || multiple || 1998–2021 || 06 Jan 2021 || 115 || align=left | Disc.: NEAT || 
|- id="2002 QC152" bgcolor=#E9E9E9
| 0 ||  || MBA-M || 16.8 || 1.8 km || multiple || 2002–2020 || 14 Nov 2020 || 157 || align=left | Disc.: NEATAlt.: 2010 GY160 || 
|- id="2002 QD152" bgcolor=#E9E9E9
| 0 ||  || MBA-M || 18.12 || data-sort-value="0.71" | 710 m || multiple || 2002–2021 || 07 Apr 2021 || 56 || align=left | Disc.: NEATAlt.: 2013 HY74 || 
|- id="2002 QE152" bgcolor=#fefefe
| 0 ||  || MBA-I || 18.95 || data-sort-value="0.48" | 480 m || multiple || 2002–2021 || 30 Jun 2021 || 44 || align=left | Disc.: NEAT || 
|- id="2002 QF152" bgcolor=#E9E9E9
| 0 ||  || MBA-M || 17.84 || 1.1 km || multiple || 2002–2020 || 25 Oct 2020 || 96 || align=left | Disc.: NEAT || 
|- id="2002 QG152" bgcolor=#E9E9E9
| 1 ||  || MBA-M || 17.9 || 1.1 km || multiple || 1998–2019 || 23 Oct 2019 || 67 || align=left | Disc.: NEAT || 
|- id="2002 QO152" bgcolor=#E9E9E9
| 0 ||  || MBA-M || 17.4 || data-sort-value="0.98" | 980 m || multiple || 2002–2021 || 18 Jan 2021 || 62 || align=left | Disc.: NEATAlt.: 2008 AT46 || 
|- id="2002 QR152" bgcolor=#fefefe
| 0 ||  || MBA-I || 17.5 || data-sort-value="0.94" | 940 m || multiple || 2002–2021 || 14 Jan 2021 || 246 || align=left | Disc.: NEAT || 
|- id="2002 QS152" bgcolor=#fefefe
| 0 ||  || MBA-I || 19.3 || data-sort-value="0.41" | 410 m || multiple || 1999–2015 || 07 Jul 2015 || 31 || align=left | Disc.: NEAT || 
|- id="2002 QU152" bgcolor=#d6d6d6
| 0 ||  || MBA-O || 16.1 || 3.4 km || multiple || 2002–2021 || 17 Jan 2021 || 214 || align=left | Disc.: NEATAlt.: 2008 TB189 || 
|- id="2002 QY152" bgcolor=#d6d6d6
| 1 ||  || MBA-O || 17.0 || 2.2 km || multiple || 2002–2019 || 06 Sep 2019 || 47 || align=left | Disc.: NEATAlt.: 2008 UH15 || 
|- id="2002 QA153" bgcolor=#d6d6d6
| 1 ||  || MBA-O || 16.8 || 2.4 km || multiple || 2002–2020 || 11 Dec 2020 || 54 || align=left | Disc.: NEAT || 
|- id="2002 QE153" bgcolor=#fefefe
| 1 ||  || MBA-I || 18.1 || data-sort-value="0.71" | 710 m || multiple || 2002–2020 || 19 Jan 2020 || 127 || align=left | Disc.: NEATAlt.: 2009 UB136 || 
|- id="2002 QF153" bgcolor=#E9E9E9
| – ||  || MBA-M || 18.8 || data-sort-value="0.52" | 520 m || single || 11 days || 30 Aug 2002 || 9 || align=left | Disc.: NEAT || 
|- id="2002 QG153" bgcolor=#d6d6d6
| 0 ||  || MBA-O || 16.0 || 3.5 km || multiple || 2002–2021 || 14 Jan 2021 || 262 || align=left | Disc.: NEAT || 
|- id="2002 QK153" bgcolor=#fefefe
| 0 ||  || MBA-I || 18.0 || data-sort-value="0.75" | 750 m || multiple || 2002–2020 || 08 Dec 2020 || 124 || align=left | Disc.: NEAT || 
|- id="2002 QP153" bgcolor=#E9E9E9
| 1 ||  || MBA-M || 17.2 || 1.5 km || multiple || 2002–2019 || 30 Nov 2019 || 107 || align=left | Disc.: NEAT || 
|- id="2002 QQ153" bgcolor=#d6d6d6
| 0 ||  || MBA-O || 16.8 || 2.4 km || multiple || 2002–2021 || 17 Jan 2021 || 97 || align=left | Disc.: NEAT || 
|- id="2002 QS153" bgcolor=#E9E9E9
| 4 ||  || MBA-M || 18.6 || data-sort-value="0.57" | 570 m || multiple || 2002–2019 || 27 Oct 2019 || 32 || align=left | Disc.: NEAT || 
|- id="2002 QU153" bgcolor=#E9E9E9
| 0 ||  || MBA-M || 17.3 || 1.5 km || multiple || 2002–2018 || 12 Feb 2018 || 103 || align=left | Disc.: NEAT || 
|- id="2002 QX153" bgcolor=#fefefe
| 0 ||  || MBA-I || 18.5 || data-sort-value="0.59" | 590 m || multiple || 1998–2020 || 24 May 2020 || 84 || align=left | Disc.: NEAT || 
|- id="2002 QZ153" bgcolor=#fefefe
| 0 ||  || MBA-I || 18.1 || data-sort-value="0.71" | 710 m || multiple || 2002–2021 || 09 Jan 2021 || 84 || align=left | Disc.: NEAT || 
|- id="2002 QB154" bgcolor=#d6d6d6
| 0 ||  || MBA-O || 16.0 || 3.5 km || multiple || 2002–2020 || 12 Apr 2020 || 110 || align=left | Disc.: NEAT || 
|- id="2002 QD154" bgcolor=#d6d6d6
| 0 ||  || MBA-O || 16.32 || 3.0 km || multiple || 2002–2021 || 18 May 2021 || 192 || align=left | Disc.: NEAT || 
|- id="2002 QF154" bgcolor=#FA8072
| 0 ||  || MCA || 18.3 || data-sort-value="0.65" | 650 m || multiple || 1992–2019 || 25 Nov 2019 || 98 || align=left | Disc.: NEATMBA at MPCAlt.: 2009 WT146 || 
|- id="2002 QG154" bgcolor=#d6d6d6
| 0 ||  || MBA-O || 16.3 || 3.1 km || multiple || 2002–2020 || 23 Jan 2020 || 99 || align=left | Disc.: NEAT || 
|- id="2002 QH154" bgcolor=#E9E9E9
| 0 ||  || MBA-M || 17.2 || 1.5 km || multiple || 2002–2021 || 16 Jan 2021 || 70 || align=left | Disc.: NEATAlt.: 2015 VT52 || 
|- id="2002 QL154" bgcolor=#E9E9E9
| 0 ||  || MBA-M || 17.9 || 1.1 km || multiple || 2002–2019 || 04 Sep 2019 || 99 || align=left | Disc.: NEAT || 
|- id="2002 QM154" bgcolor=#d6d6d6
| 0 ||  || MBA-O || 17.10 || 2.1 km || multiple || 2002–2021 || 09 Apr 2021 || 44 || align=left | Disc.: NEAT || 
|- id="2002 QN154" bgcolor=#E9E9E9
| 0 ||  || MBA-M || 17.8 || data-sort-value="0.82" | 820 m || multiple || 2002–2019 || 16 Dec 2019 || 114 || align=left | Disc.: NEATAlt.: 2013 EL29 || 
|- id="2002 QQ154" bgcolor=#d6d6d6
| 0 ||  || MBA-O || 16.25 || 3.1 km || multiple || 2002–2021 || 15 Apr 2021 || 194 || align=left | Disc.: NEATAlt.: 2006 HL112, 2010 FW52 || 
|- id="2002 QS154" bgcolor=#d6d6d6
| 0 ||  || MBA-O || 16.4 || 2.9 km || multiple || 2002–2021 || 17 Jan 2021 || 101 || align=left | Disc.: NEATAlt.: 2013 RV46 || 
|- id="2002 QT154" bgcolor=#E9E9E9
| 0 ||  || MBA-M || 17.9 || 1.1 km || multiple || 2002–2021 || 15 Jan 2021 || 86 || align=left | Disc.: NEATAlt.: 2015 RN107 || 
|- id="2002 QU154" bgcolor=#d6d6d6
| – ||  || MBA-O || 17.5 || 1.8 km || single || 17 days || 15 Sep 2002 || 12 || align=left | Disc.: NEAT || 
|- id="2002 QE155" bgcolor=#d6d6d6
| 0 ||  || MBA-O || 17.58 || 1.7 km || multiple || 2002–2017 || 23 Nov 2017 || 39 || align=left | Disc.: NEAT || 
|- id="2002 QG155" bgcolor=#E9E9E9
| – ||  || MBA-M || 18.4 || data-sort-value="0.62" | 620 m || single || 41 days || 30 Sep 2002 || 15 || align=left | Disc.: NEAT || 
|- id="2002 QH155" bgcolor=#d6d6d6
| 0 ||  || MBA-O || 17.0 || 2.2 km || multiple || 2002–2018 || 05 Oct 2018 || 50 || align=left | Disc.: NEAT || 
|- id="2002 QJ155" bgcolor=#fefefe
| 0 ||  || MBA-I || 18.1 || data-sort-value="0.71" | 710 m || multiple || 2002–2020 || 02 Feb 2020 || 156 || align=left | Disc.: NEAT || 
|- id="2002 QL155" bgcolor=#E9E9E9
| 2 ||  || MBA-M || 17.5 || data-sort-value="0.94" | 940 m || multiple || 2002–2019 || 28 Dec 2019 || 35 || align=left | Disc.: NEATAlt.: 2019 XH3 || 
|- id="2002 QM155" bgcolor=#fefefe
| 0 ||  || MBA-I || 17.9 || data-sort-value="0.78" | 780 m || multiple || 2002–2020 || 15 Aug 2020 || 90 || align=left | Disc.: NEAT || 
|- id="2002 QO155" bgcolor=#E9E9E9
| 0 ||  || MBA-M || 17.7 || 1.6 km || multiple || 2002–2020 || 20 Oct 2020 || 89 || align=left | Disc.: NEAT || 
|- id="2002 QP155" bgcolor=#d6d6d6
| 0 ||  || MBA-O || 16.75 || 2.5 km || multiple || 2002–2021 || 09 Apr 2021 || 60 || align=left | Disc.: NEATAlt.: 2017 LV1 || 
|- id="2002 QT155" bgcolor=#d6d6d6
| 0 ||  || MBA-O || 17.1 || 2.1 km || multiple || 2002–2019 || 31 Dec 2019 || 84 || align=left | Disc.: NEATAlt.: 2013 QE81 || 
|- id="2002 QW155" bgcolor=#d6d6d6
| 0 ||  || MBA-O || 16.93 || 2.3 km || multiple || 2002–2021 || 10 Apr 2021 || 100 || align=left | Disc.: NEAT || 
|- id="2002 QX155" bgcolor=#fefefe
| 0 ||  || MBA-I || 18.4 || data-sort-value="0.62" | 620 m || multiple || 1999–2019 || 03 Dec 2019 || 87 || align=left | Disc.: NEATAlt.: 2012 TH80, 2015 NJ2 || 
|- id="2002 QY155" bgcolor=#fefefe
| 1 ||  || MBA-I || 18.7 || data-sort-value="0.54" | 540 m || multiple || 2002–2019 || 26 Nov 2019 || 70 || align=left | Disc.: NEAT || 
|- id="2002 QA156" bgcolor=#FA8072
| 2 ||  || HUN || 19.3 || data-sort-value="0.41" | 410 m || multiple || 2002–2018 || 01 Jan 2018 || 40 || align=left | Disc.: NEAT || 
|- id="2002 QB156" bgcolor=#d6d6d6
| 0 ||  || MBA-O || 16.3 || 3.1 km || multiple || 2002–2021 || 08 Jan 2021 || 127 || align=left | Disc.: NEAT || 
|- id="2002 QC156" bgcolor=#E9E9E9
| 0 ||  || MBA-M || 17.3 || 1.5 km || multiple || 2002–2019 || 27 Oct 2019 || 112 || align=left | Disc.: NEATAlt.: 2015 RK29 || 
|- id="2002 QE156" bgcolor=#d6d6d6
| 0 ||  || MBA-O || 16.5 || 2.8 km || multiple || 2002–2020 || 21 Jan 2020 || 83 || align=left | Disc.: NEAT || 
|- id="2002 QF156" bgcolor=#d6d6d6
| 0 ||  || MBA-O || 15.7 || 4.0 km || multiple || 2002–2021 || 17 Jan 2021 || 189 || align=left | Disc.: NEATAlt.: 2012 KO37, 2014 WR505 || 
|- id="2002 QG156" bgcolor=#fefefe
| 0 ||  || MBA-I || 18.4 || data-sort-value="0.62" | 620 m || multiple || 2002–2020 || 04 Nov 2020 || 87 || align=left | Disc.: NEATAlt.: 2016 LJ19 || 
|- id="2002 QH156" bgcolor=#fefefe
| 2 ||  || MBA-I || 18.6 || data-sort-value="0.57" | 570 m || multiple || 2002–2020 || 15 Nov 2020 || 74 || align=left | Disc.: NEAT || 
|- id="2002 QJ156" bgcolor=#fefefe
| 0 ||  || MBA-I || 18.1 || data-sort-value="0.71" | 710 m || multiple || 2002–2020 || 10 Dec 2020 || 100 || align=left | Disc.: NEAT || 
|- id="2002 QM156" bgcolor=#E9E9E9
| 0 ||  || MBA-M || 17.5 || 1.3 km || multiple || 2002–2021 || 04 Jan 2021 || 68 || align=left | Disc.: NEAT || 
|- id="2002 QN156" bgcolor=#d6d6d6
| 0 ||  || MBA-O || 16.5 || 2.8 km || multiple || 2002–2021 || 18 Jan 2021 || 53 || align=left | Disc.: NEATAlt.: 2013 QZ65 || 
|- id="2002 QO156" bgcolor=#E9E9E9
| 0 ||  || MBA-M || 16.66 || 2.6 km || multiple || 2002–2022 || 07 Jan 2022 || 251 || align=left | Disc.: NEATAlt.: 2010 NH91, 2011 QB99 || 
|- id="2002 QP156" bgcolor=#E9E9E9
| 0 ||  || MBA-M || 16.3 || 2.3 km || multiple || 1998–2021 || 16 Jan 2021 || 271 || align=left | Disc.: NEATAlt.: 2015 QL11, 2016 AN91 || 
|- id="2002 QQ156" bgcolor=#d6d6d6
| 0 ||  || MBA-O || 16.9 || 2.3 km || multiple || 2002–2019 || 29 Nov 2019 || 65 || align=left | Disc.: NEATAlt.: 2013 NG19 || 
|- id="2002 QR156" bgcolor=#fefefe
| 0 ||  || MBA-I || 17.11 || 1.1 km || multiple || 2002–2021 || 28 Aug 2021 || 109 || align=left | Disc.: NEAT || 
|- id="2002 QS156" bgcolor=#fefefe
| 0 ||  || MBA-I || 18.31 || data-sort-value="0.65" | 650 m || multiple || 2002–2021 || 02 Dec 2021 || 144 || align=left | Disc.: NEAT || 
|- id="2002 QX156" bgcolor=#d6d6d6
| 0 ||  || MBA-O || 15.6 || 4.2 km || multiple || 2002–2021 || 11 Jan 2021 || 154 || align=left | Disc.: NEATAlt.: 2016 BW11 || 
|- id="2002 QZ156" bgcolor=#E9E9E9
| 0 ||  || MBA-M || 16.55 || 1.5 km || multiple || 2002–2021 || 08 Apr 2021 || 179 || align=left | Disc.: NEATAlt.: 2006 QF63, 2014 QE163, 2017 DN95 || 
|- id="2002 QA157" bgcolor=#fefefe
| 0 ||  || MBA-I || 18.7 || data-sort-value="0.54" | 540 m || multiple || 2001–2020 || 17 Nov 2020 || 98 || align=left | Disc.: NEAT || 
|- id="2002 QB157" bgcolor=#E9E9E9
| 0 ||  || MBA-M || 17.17 || 2.0 km || multiple || 2001–2021 || 02 Dec 2021 || 133 || align=left | Disc.: NEATAlt.: 2014 EH98 || 
|- id="2002 QC157" bgcolor=#d6d6d6
| 2 ||  || MBA-O || 17.1 || 2.1 km || multiple || 2002–2021 || 08 May 2021 || 30 || align=left | Disc.: NEAT || 
|- id="2002 QD157" bgcolor=#E9E9E9
| 2 ||  || MBA-M || 17.7 || data-sort-value="0.86" | 860 m || multiple || 2002–2018 || 14 Jun 2018 || 40 || align=left | Disc.: NEAT || 
|- id="2002 QF157" bgcolor=#d6d6d6
| 0 ||  || MBA-O || 16.62 || 2.6 km || multiple || 1994–2021 || 05 Jul 2021 || 185 || align=left | Disc.: NEATAlt.: 2016 NH56 || 
|- id="2002 QH157" bgcolor=#fefefe
| 1 ||  || MBA-I || 18.8 || data-sort-value="0.52" | 520 m || multiple || 1995–2020 || 12 Dec 2020 || 47 || align=left | Disc.: NEAT || 
|- id="2002 QJ157" bgcolor=#E9E9E9
| 3 ||  || MBA-M || 17.8 || data-sort-value="0.82" | 820 m || multiple || 2002–2019 || 04 Dec 2019 || 30 || align=left | Disc.: NEATAlt.: 2019 UY78 || 
|- id="2002 QK157" bgcolor=#E9E9E9
| 0 ||  || MBA-M || 17.8 || 1.2 km || multiple || 2001–2019 || 03 Oct 2019 || 74 || align=left | Disc.: NEAT || 
|- id="2002 QL157" bgcolor=#fefefe
| 0 ||  || MBA-I || 17.8 || data-sort-value="0.82" | 820 m || multiple || 2002–2020 || 19 Oct 2020 || 164 || align=left | Disc.: NEAT || 
|- id="2002 QM157" bgcolor=#d6d6d6
| 0 ||  || MBA-O || 17.0 || 2.2 km || multiple || 2002–2018 || 07 Sep 2018 || 82 || align=left | Disc.: NEATAlt.: 2018 QK4 || 
|- id="2002 QO157" bgcolor=#fefefe
| 0 ||  || MBA-I || 18.91 || data-sort-value="0.49" | 490 m || multiple || 2002–2021 || 08 May 2021 || 91 || align=left | Disc.: NEATAlt.: 2015 PH2 || 
|- id="2002 QP157" bgcolor=#fefefe
| 1 ||  || MBA-I || 18.5 || data-sort-value="0.59" | 590 m || multiple || 2002–2020 || 19 Jan 2020 || 74 || align=left | Disc.: NEAT || 
|- id="2002 QQ157" bgcolor=#fefefe
| 0 ||  || MBA-I || 18.3 || data-sort-value="0.65" | 650 m || multiple || 1995–2020 || 17 Dec 2020 || 109 || align=left | Disc.: NEAT || 
|- id="2002 QR157" bgcolor=#d6d6d6
| 0 ||  || MBA-O || 16.39 || 2.9 km || multiple || 2002–2022 || 26 Jan 2022 || 153 || align=left | Disc.: NEAT || 
|- id="2002 QS157" bgcolor=#fefefe
| 0 ||  || MBA-I || 17.4 || data-sort-value="0.98" | 980 m || multiple || 2002–2021 || 09 Jan 2021 || 126 || align=left | Disc.: NEATAlt.: 2009 QT18, 2016 QL34 || 
|- id="2002 QT157" bgcolor=#fefefe
| 0 ||  || MBA-I || 17.9 || data-sort-value="0.78" | 780 m || multiple || 1995–2020 || 17 Oct 2020 || 108 || align=left | Disc.: NEAT || 
|- id="2002 QU157" bgcolor=#E9E9E9
| 2 ||  || MBA-M || 18.1 || data-sort-value="0.71" | 710 m || multiple || 2002–2018 || 05 Oct 2018 || 63 || align=left | Disc.: NEATAlt.: 2010 KW147 || 
|- id="2002 QX157" bgcolor=#d6d6d6
| 0 ||  || MBA-O || 16.50 || 2.8 km || multiple || 2002–2021 || 03 May 2021 || 102 || align=left | Disc.: NEAT || 
|- id="2002 QY157" bgcolor=#E9E9E9
| 0 ||  || MBA-M || 16.93 || 1.2 km || multiple || 2002–2021 || 03 May 2021 || 162 || align=left | Disc.: NEAT || 
|- id="2002 QZ157" bgcolor=#fefefe
| 0 ||  || MBA-I || 17.5 || data-sort-value="0.94" | 940 m || multiple || 1997–2020 || 06 Dec 2020 || 164 || align=left | Disc.: NEATAlt.: 2011 BM118 || 
|- id="2002 QB158" bgcolor=#d6d6d6
| 0 ||  || MBA-O || 17.0 || 2.2 km || multiple || 2002–2018 || 15 Oct 2018 || 53 || align=left | Disc.: NEAT || 
|- id="2002 QC158" bgcolor=#d6d6d6
| 0 ||  || HIL || 15.3 || 5.3 km || multiple || 1995–2021 || 15 Jan 2021 || 151 || align=left | Disc.: NEATAlt.: 2010 MC21, 2013 CY99 || 
|- id="2002 QE158" bgcolor=#d6d6d6
| 0 ||  || MBA-O || 16.23 || 3.2 km || multiple || 2002–2021 || 15 Apr 2021 || 98 || align=left | Disc.: NEATAlt.: 2008 UE239, 2010 GB38 || 
|- id="2002 QF158" bgcolor=#d6d6d6
| 0 ||  || MBA-O || 16.4 || 2.9 km || multiple || 2002–2020 || 26 Jan 2020 || 120 || align=left | Disc.: NEATAlt.: 2015 AR97 || 
|- id="2002 QG158" bgcolor=#E9E9E9
| 3 ||  || MBA-M || 17.9 || data-sort-value="0.78" | 780 m || multiple || 2002–2019 || 24 Dec 2019 || 35 || align=left | Disc.: NEATAlt.: 2016 AB68 || 
|- id="2002 QH158" bgcolor=#d6d6d6
| 0 ||  || MBA-O || 16.9 || 2.3 km || multiple || 2002–2020 || 14 Oct 2020 || 55 || align=left | Disc.: NEAT || 
|- id="2002 QJ158" bgcolor=#d6d6d6
| 1 ||  || MBA-O || 17.1 || 2.1 km || multiple || 2002–2021 || 07 Jun 2021 || 63 || align=left | Disc.: NEAT || 
|- id="2002 QK158" bgcolor=#E9E9E9
| 0 ||  || MBA-M || 16.52 || 3.2 km || multiple || 1994–2021 || 11 Jun 2021 || 352 || align=left | Disc.: NEATAlt.: 2010 JU69, 2016 DG2 || 
|- id="2002 QN158" bgcolor=#d6d6d6
| 0 ||  || MBA-O || 16.3 || 3.1 km || multiple || 2002–2021 || 18 Jan 2021 || 100 || align=left | Disc.: NEAT || 
|- id="2002 QP158" bgcolor=#d6d6d6
| 0 ||  || MBA-O || 16.8 || 2.4 km || multiple || 2002–2019 || 04 Nov 2019 || 65 || align=left | Disc.: LPL/Spacewatch II || 
|- id="2002 QQ158" bgcolor=#d6d6d6
| 0 ||  || MBA-O || 16.02 || 3.5 km || multiple || 2002–2021 || 08 Sep 2021 || 105 || align=left | Disc.: NEAT || 
|- id="2002 QR158" bgcolor=#d6d6d6
| 0 ||  || MBA-O || 17.0 || 2.2 km || multiple || 2002–2020 || 16 May 2020 || 87 || align=left | Disc.: LPL/Spacewatch II || 
|- id="2002 QS158" bgcolor=#fefefe
| 0 ||  || MBA-I || 17.8 || data-sort-value="0.82" | 820 m || multiple || 2002–2020 || 16 Dec 2020 || 91 || align=left | Disc.: NEAT || 
|- id="2002 QT158" bgcolor=#E9E9E9
| 0 ||  || MBA-M || 16.98 || 1.2 km || multiple || 2002–2021 || 14 Apr 2021 || 118 || align=left | Disc.: NEAT || 
|- id="2002 QV158" bgcolor=#fefefe
| 0 ||  || MBA-I || 18.0 || data-sort-value="0.75" | 750 m || multiple || 2002–2021 || 07 Jan 2021 || 175 || align=left | Disc.: NEAT || 
|- id="2002 QW158" bgcolor=#d6d6d6
| 0 ||  || MBA-O || 16.7 || 2.5 km || multiple || 2002–2021 || 18 Jan 2021 || 78 || align=left | Disc.: NEAT || 
|- id="2002 QX158" bgcolor=#fefefe
| 1 ||  || MBA-I || 18.6 || data-sort-value="0.57" | 570 m || multiple || 2002–2021 || 18 Jan 2021 || 54 || align=left | Disc.: LPL/Spacewatch II || 
|- id="2002 QZ158" bgcolor=#E9E9E9
| 0 ||  || MBA-M || 17.23 || 1.1 km || multiple || 2002–2021 || 15 May 2021 || 126 || align=left | Disc.: NEAT || 
|- id="2002 QB159" bgcolor=#fefefe
| 0 ||  || MBA-I || 18.3 || data-sort-value="0.65" | 650 m || multiple || 2002–2017 || 13 Nov 2017 || 36 || align=left | Disc.: NEAT || 
|- id="2002 QC159" bgcolor=#E9E9E9
| 1 ||  || MBA-M || 18.0 || 1.1 km || multiple || 1998–2019 || 21 Nov 2019 || 57 || align=left | Disc.: NEATAlt.: 2019 ND28 || 
|- id="2002 QD159" bgcolor=#fefefe
| 0 ||  || MBA-I || 18.0 || data-sort-value="0.75" | 750 m || multiple || 2002–2020 || 12 Dec 2020 || 119 || align=left | Disc.: NEAT || 
|- id="2002 QF159" bgcolor=#fefefe
| 0 ||  || MBA-I || 18.30 || data-sort-value="0.65" | 650 m || multiple || 2008–2021 || 14 Apr 2021 || 125 || align=left | Disc.: NEAT || 
|- id="2002 QG159" bgcolor=#fefefe
| 0 ||  || MBA-I || 18.2 || data-sort-value="0.68" | 680 m || multiple || 2002–2019 || 24 Jul 2019 || 74 || align=left | Disc.: LPL/Spacewatch II || 
|- id="2002 QH159" bgcolor=#d6d6d6
| 0 ||  || MBA-O || 16.9 || 2.3 km || multiple || 2002–2019 || 20 Oct 2019 || 65 || align=left | Disc.: LPL/Spacewatch II || 
|- id="2002 QJ159" bgcolor=#d6d6d6
| 0 ||  || MBA-O || 16.8 || 2.4 km || multiple || 2002–2018 || 18 Oct 2018 || 59 || align=left | Disc.: NEAT || 
|- id="2002 QN159" bgcolor=#E9E9E9
| 0 ||  || MBA-M || 18.01 || data-sort-value="0.74" | 740 m || multiple || 1998–2021 || 09 Apr 2021 || 61 || align=left | Disc.: LPL/Spacewatch II || 
|- id="2002 QO159" bgcolor=#d6d6d6
| 0 ||  || MBA-O || 16.82 || 2.4 km || multiple || 2002–2021 || 01 May 2021 || 99 || align=left | Disc.: NEAT || 
|- id="2002 QP159" bgcolor=#E9E9E9
| 0 ||  || MBA-M || 17.9 || 1.1 km || multiple || 2002–2019 || 29 Oct 2019 || 49 || align=left | Disc.: LPL/Spacewatch II || 
|- id="2002 QR159" bgcolor=#E9E9E9
| 0 ||  || MBA-M || 17.88 || data-sort-value="0.79" | 790 m || multiple || 2002–2021 || 16 Jan 2021 || 58 || align=left | Disc.: NEAT || 
|- id="2002 QS159" bgcolor=#E9E9E9
| 0 ||  || MBA-M || 17.6 || data-sort-value="0.90" | 900 m || multiple || 2002–2019 || 25 Oct 2019 || 45 || align=left | Disc.: NEAT || 
|- id="2002 QT159" bgcolor=#fefefe
| 0 ||  || MBA-I || 18.3 || data-sort-value="0.65" | 650 m || multiple || 2002–2020 || 19 Nov 2020 || 48 || align=left | Disc.: NEAT || 
|- id="2002 QU159" bgcolor=#E9E9E9
| 0 ||  || MBA-M || 18.0 || data-sort-value="0.75" | 750 m || multiple || 1998–2019 || 02 Nov 2019 || 46 || align=left | Disc.: NEAT || 
|- id="2002 QV159" bgcolor=#E9E9E9
| 2 ||  || MBA-M || 17.7 || data-sort-value="0.86" | 860 m || multiple || 2002–2019 || 20 Dec 2019 || 64 || align=left | Disc.: LPL/Spacewatch II || 
|- id="2002 QW159" bgcolor=#d6d6d6
| 0 ||  || MBA-O || 17.1 || 2.1 km || multiple || 2002–2018 || 06 Oct 2018 || 40 || align=left | Disc.: LPL/Spacewatch II || 
|- id="2002 QX159" bgcolor=#E9E9E9
| 0 ||  || MBA-M || 18.3 || data-sort-value="0.92" | 920 m || multiple || 2002–2019 || 27 Oct 2019 || 41 || align=left | Disc.: LPL/Spacewatch II || 
|- id="2002 QY159" bgcolor=#E9E9E9
| 2 ||  || MBA-M || 18.2 || data-sort-value="0.96" | 960 m || multiple || 2002–2019 || 05 Nov 2019 || 40 || align=left | Disc.: LPL/Spacewatch II || 
|- id="2002 QA160" bgcolor=#E9E9E9
| 0 ||  || MBA-M || 18.2 || data-sort-value="0.96" | 960 m || multiple || 2002–2020 || 09 Dec 2020 || 47 || align=left | Disc.: LPL/Spacewatch II || 
|- id="2002 QC160" bgcolor=#E9E9E9
| 0 ||  || MBA-M || 18.2 || data-sort-value="0.96" | 960 m || multiple || 2002–2019 || 20 Aug 2019 || 30 || align=left | Disc.: NEAT || 
|- id="2002 QD160" bgcolor=#fefefe
| 0 ||  || MBA-I || 18.5 || data-sort-value="0.59" | 590 m || multiple || 2002–2020 || 17 Sep 2020 || 69 || align=left | Disc.: NEAT || 
|- id="2002 QE160" bgcolor=#d6d6d6
| 0 ||  || MBA-O || 16.6 || 2.7 km || multiple || 2002–2020 || 11 Dec 2020 || 99 || align=left | Disc.: LPL/Spacewatch II || 
|- id="2002 QF160" bgcolor=#E9E9E9
| 0 ||  || MBA-M || 17.7 || 1.2 km || multiple || 2002–2019 || 22 Aug 2019 || 46 || align=left | Disc.: NEAT || 
|- id="2002 QG160" bgcolor=#E9E9E9
| 0 ||  || MBA-M || 18.0 || 1.1 km || multiple || 2002–2019 || 28 Aug 2019 || 41 || align=left | Disc.: LPL/Spacewatch II || 
|- id="2002 QH160" bgcolor=#fefefe
| 0 ||  || MBA-I || 18.6 || data-sort-value="0.57" | 570 m || multiple || 2002–2020 || 24 May 2020 || 43 || align=left | Disc.: NEAT || 
|- id="2002 QJ160" bgcolor=#E9E9E9
| 1 ||  || MBA-M || 17.9 || data-sort-value="0.78" | 780 m || multiple || 2002–2020 || 01 Feb 2020 || 48 || align=left | Disc.: NEAT || 
|- id="2002 QK160" bgcolor=#E9E9E9
| 0 ||  || MBA-M || 17.87 || 1.5 km || multiple || 2002–2021 || 09 Dec 2021 || 82 || align=left | Disc.: LPL/Spacewatch II || 
|- id="2002 QL160" bgcolor=#E9E9E9
| 0 ||  || MBA-M || 18.1 || data-sort-value="0.71" | 710 m || multiple || 2002–2020 || 23 Jan 2020 || 26 || align=left | Disc.: LPL/Spacewatch II || 
|- id="2002 QM160" bgcolor=#E9E9E9
| 0 ||  || MBA-M || 18.0 || 1.4 km || multiple || 2002–2020 || 17 Aug 2020 || 43 || align=left | Disc.: LPL/Spacewatch IIAdded on 19 October 2020 || 
|- id="2002 QN160" bgcolor=#E9E9E9
| 0 ||  || MBA-M || 17.4 || 1.4 km || multiple || 2002–2019 || 02 Dec 2019 || 47 || align=left | Disc.: LPL/Spacewatch IIAdded on 17 January 2021 || 
|- id="2002 QP160" bgcolor=#d6d6d6
| 0 ||  || MBA-O || 17.27 || 2.0 km || multiple || 2002–2022 || 25 Jan 2022 || 30 || align=left | Disc.: LPL/Spacewatch IIAdded on 9 March 2021 || 
|- id="2002 QS160" bgcolor=#d6d6d6
| 0 ||  || MBA-O || 17.2 || 2.0 km || multiple || 2002–2021 || 09 Jul 2021 || 32 || align=left | Disc.: NEATAdded on 5 November 2021 || 
|}
back to top

References 
 

Lists of unnumbered minor planets